

609001–609100 

|-bgcolor=#E9E9E9
| 609001 ||  || — || October 1, 2000 || Anderson Mesa || LONEOS ||  || align=right | 1.1 km || 
|-id=002 bgcolor=#E9E9E9
| 609002 ||  || — || September 10, 2004 || Socorro || LINEAR ||  || align=right | 1.1 km || 
|-id=003 bgcolor=#fefefe
| 609003 ||  || — || September 10, 2004 || Kitt Peak || Spacewatch ||  || align=right data-sort-value="0.51" | 510 m || 
|-id=004 bgcolor=#d6d6d6
| 609004 ||  || — || March 21, 2002 || Kitt Peak || Spacewatch ||  || align=right | 2.9 km || 
|-id=005 bgcolor=#fefefe
| 609005 ||  || — || September 10, 2004 || Socorro || LINEAR ||  || align=right data-sort-value="0.60" | 600 m || 
|-id=006 bgcolor=#fefefe
| 609006 ||  || — || September 10, 2004 || Kitt Peak || Spacewatch ||  || align=right data-sort-value="0.67" | 670 m || 
|-id=007 bgcolor=#E9E9E9
| 609007 ||  || — || September 10, 2004 || Kitt Peak || Spacewatch ||  || align=right data-sort-value="0.51" | 510 m || 
|-id=008 bgcolor=#d6d6d6
| 609008 ||  || — || September 12, 2004 || Socorro || LINEAR ||  || align=right | 2.2 km || 
|-id=009 bgcolor=#E9E9E9
| 609009 ||  || — || September 10, 2004 || Kitt Peak || Spacewatch ||  || align=right data-sort-value="0.70" | 700 m || 
|-id=010 bgcolor=#E9E9E9
| 609010 ||  || — || September 10, 2004 || Kitt Peak || Spacewatch ||  || align=right data-sort-value="0.87" | 870 m || 
|-id=011 bgcolor=#E9E9E9
| 609011 ||  || — || September 10, 2004 || Kitt Peak || Spacewatch ||  || align=right data-sort-value="0.68" | 680 m || 
|-id=012 bgcolor=#d6d6d6
| 609012 ||  || — || September 10, 2004 || Kitt Peak || Spacewatch ||  || align=right | 1.8 km || 
|-id=013 bgcolor=#d6d6d6
| 609013 ||  || — || September 10, 2004 || Kitt Peak || Spacewatch ||  || align=right | 2.0 km || 
|-id=014 bgcolor=#d6d6d6
| 609014 ||  || — || September 10, 2004 || Kitt Peak || Spacewatch ||  || align=right | 2.5 km || 
|-id=015 bgcolor=#d6d6d6
| 609015 ||  || — || September 11, 2004 || Kitt Peak || Spacewatch ||  || align=right | 2.6 km || 
|-id=016 bgcolor=#d6d6d6
| 609016 ||  || — || September 11, 2004 || Kitt Peak || Spacewatch ||  || align=right | 2.1 km || 
|-id=017 bgcolor=#d6d6d6
| 609017 ||  || — || September 11, 2004 || Kitt Peak || Spacewatch ||  || align=right | 2.1 km || 
|-id=018 bgcolor=#E9E9E9
| 609018 ||  || — || September 13, 2004 || Kitt Peak || Spacewatch ||  || align=right | 1.3 km || 
|-id=019 bgcolor=#d6d6d6
| 609019 ||  || — || September 13, 2004 || Kitt Peak || Spacewatch ||  || align=right | 2.3 km || 
|-id=020 bgcolor=#d6d6d6
| 609020 ||  || — || September 15, 2004 || Kitt Peak || Spacewatch ||  || align=right | 2.7 km || 
|-id=021 bgcolor=#d6d6d6
| 609021 ||  || — || September 15, 2004 || Kitt Peak || Spacewatch ||  || align=right | 2.9 km || 
|-id=022 bgcolor=#E9E9E9
| 609022 ||  || — || February 8, 2002 || Kitt Peak || R. Millis, M. W. Buie ||  || align=right data-sort-value="0.83" | 830 m || 
|-id=023 bgcolor=#fefefe
| 609023 ||  || — || August 10, 2004 || Palomar || NEAT || H || align=right data-sort-value="0.88" | 880 m || 
|-id=024 bgcolor=#d6d6d6
| 609024 ||  || — || September 11, 2004 || Kitt Peak || Spacewatch ||  || align=right | 2.0 km || 
|-id=025 bgcolor=#E9E9E9
| 609025 ||  || — || September 11, 2004 || Kitt Peak || Spacewatch ||  || align=right data-sort-value="0.88" | 880 m || 
|-id=026 bgcolor=#d6d6d6
| 609026 ||  || — || September 11, 2004 || Kitt Peak || Spacewatch ||  || align=right | 2.2 km || 
|-id=027 bgcolor=#d6d6d6
| 609027 ||  || — || September 11, 2004 || Kitt Peak || Spacewatch ||  || align=right | 2.0 km || 
|-id=028 bgcolor=#fefefe
| 609028 ||  || — || August 22, 2004 || Kitt Peak || Spacewatch ||  || align=right data-sort-value="0.57" | 570 m || 
|-id=029 bgcolor=#E9E9E9
| 609029 ||  || — || September 13, 2004 || Kitt Peak || Spacewatch ||  || align=right | 1.1 km || 
|-id=030 bgcolor=#E9E9E9
| 609030 ||  || — || September 15, 2004 || Kitt Peak || Spacewatch ||  || align=right data-sort-value="0.85" | 850 m || 
|-id=031 bgcolor=#d6d6d6
| 609031 ||  || — || September 15, 2004 || Kitt Peak || Spacewatch ||  || align=right | 2.2 km || 
|-id=032 bgcolor=#d6d6d6
| 609032 ||  || — || September 13, 2004 || Kitt Peak || Spacewatch ||  || align=right | 2.1 km || 
|-id=033 bgcolor=#FA8072
| 609033 ||  || — || September 18, 2004 || Socorro || LINEAR ||  || align=right data-sort-value="0.54" | 540 m || 
|-id=034 bgcolor=#d6d6d6
| 609034 ||  || — || March 20, 2007 || Mount Lemmon || Mount Lemmon Survey ||  || align=right | 2.2 km || 
|-id=035 bgcolor=#d6d6d6
| 609035 ||  || — || January 22, 2006 || Mount Lemmon || Mount Lemmon Survey ||  || align=right | 2.2 km || 
|-id=036 bgcolor=#E9E9E9
| 609036 ||  || — || October 20, 2004 || Catalina || CSS ||  || align=right data-sort-value="0.88" | 880 m || 
|-id=037 bgcolor=#E9E9E9
| 609037 ||  || — || February 18, 2007 || Altschwendt || W. Ries ||  || align=right data-sort-value="0.81" | 810 m || 
|-id=038 bgcolor=#E9E9E9
| 609038 ||  || — || August 7, 2008 || Kitt Peak || Spacewatch ||  || align=right data-sort-value="0.73" | 730 m || 
|-id=039 bgcolor=#d6d6d6
| 609039 ||  || — || January 21, 2012 || Kitt Peak || Spacewatch ||  || align=right | 2.4 km || 
|-id=040 bgcolor=#E9E9E9
| 609040 ||  || — || April 23, 2015 || Haleakala || Pan-STARRS ||  || align=right data-sort-value="0.81" | 810 m || 
|-id=041 bgcolor=#d6d6d6
| 609041 ||  || — || September 9, 2015 || Haleakala || Pan-STARRS ||  || align=right | 1.9 km || 
|-id=042 bgcolor=#d6d6d6
| 609042 ||  || — || September 7, 2004 || Kitt Peak || Spacewatch ||  || align=right | 2.7 km || 
|-id=043 bgcolor=#d6d6d6
| 609043 ||  || — || February 17, 2007 || Kitt Peak || Spacewatch ||  || align=right | 2.0 km || 
|-id=044 bgcolor=#fefefe
| 609044 ||  || — || January 3, 2009 || Kitt Peak || Spacewatch ||  || align=right data-sort-value="0.58" | 580 m || 
|-id=045 bgcolor=#E9E9E9
| 609045 ||  || — || December 19, 2009 || Mount Lemmon || Mount Lemmon Survey ||  || align=right | 1.2 km || 
|-id=046 bgcolor=#E9E9E9
| 609046 ||  || — || August 30, 2016 || Haleakala || Pan-STARRS ||  || align=right data-sort-value="0.84" | 840 m || 
|-id=047 bgcolor=#E9E9E9
| 609047 ||  || — || August 17, 2012 || Haleakala || Pan-STARRS ||  || align=right data-sort-value="0.72" | 720 m || 
|-id=048 bgcolor=#E9E9E9
| 609048 ||  || — || September 11, 2004 || Kitt Peak || Spacewatch ||  || align=right data-sort-value="0.74" | 740 m || 
|-id=049 bgcolor=#d6d6d6
| 609049 ||  || — || September 9, 2004 || Kitt Peak || Spacewatch || 3:2 || align=right | 3.4 km || 
|-id=050 bgcolor=#E9E9E9
| 609050 ||  || — || September 16, 2004 || Mauna Kea || J. Pittichová ||  || align=right | 1.0 km || 
|-id=051 bgcolor=#d6d6d6
| 609051 ||  || — || September 17, 2004 || Kitt Peak || Spacewatch ||  || align=right | 2.2 km || 
|-id=052 bgcolor=#fefefe
| 609052 ||  || — || September 17, 2004 || Wise || D. Polishook ||  || align=right data-sort-value="0.61" | 610 m || 
|-id=053 bgcolor=#d6d6d6
| 609053 ||  || — || September 7, 2004 || Socorro || LINEAR ||  || align=right | 2.9 km || 
|-id=054 bgcolor=#E9E9E9
| 609054 ||  || — || September 17, 2004 || Kitt Peak || Spacewatch ||  || align=right data-sort-value="0.88" | 880 m || 
|-id=055 bgcolor=#d6d6d6
| 609055 ||  || — || September 18, 2004 || Socorro || LINEAR ||  || align=right | 3.2 km || 
|-id=056 bgcolor=#E9E9E9
| 609056 ||  || — || September 24, 2004 || Kitt Peak || Spacewatch ||  || align=right data-sort-value="0.94" | 940 m || 
|-id=057 bgcolor=#d6d6d6
| 609057 ||  || — || September 10, 2015 || Haleakala || Pan-STARRS ||  || align=right | 1.8 km || 
|-id=058 bgcolor=#fefefe
| 609058 ||  || — || September 17, 2004 || Kitt Peak || Spacewatch ||  || align=right data-sort-value="0.57" | 570 m || 
|-id=059 bgcolor=#d6d6d6
| 609059 ||  || — || November 30, 2005 || Mount Lemmon || Mount Lemmon Survey || 3:2 || align=right | 3.2 km || 
|-id=060 bgcolor=#d6d6d6
| 609060 ||  || — || March 9, 2007 || Kitt Peak || Spacewatch ||  || align=right | 2.6 km || 
|-id=061 bgcolor=#d6d6d6
| 609061 ||  || — || September 23, 2004 || Kitt Peak || Spacewatch ||  || align=right | 2.2 km || 
|-id=062 bgcolor=#d6d6d6
| 609062 ||  || — || October 4, 2004 || Kitt Peak || Spacewatch ||  || align=right | 2.4 km || 
|-id=063 bgcolor=#d6d6d6
| 609063 ||  || — || October 4, 2004 || Kitt Peak || Spacewatch ||  || align=right | 2.6 km || 
|-id=064 bgcolor=#d6d6d6
| 609064 ||  || — || October 4, 2004 || Kitt Peak || Spacewatch ||  || align=right | 2.4 km || 
|-id=065 bgcolor=#d6d6d6
| 609065 ||  || — || October 4, 2004 || Kitt Peak || Spacewatch ||  || align=right | 2.0 km || 
|-id=066 bgcolor=#d6d6d6
| 609066 ||  || — || October 4, 2004 || Kitt Peak || Spacewatch ||  || align=right | 1.8 km || 
|-id=067 bgcolor=#d6d6d6
| 609067 ||  || — || October 4, 2004 || Kitt Peak || Spacewatch ||  || align=right | 2.1 km || 
|-id=068 bgcolor=#d6d6d6
| 609068 ||  || — || October 4, 2004 || Kitt Peak || Spacewatch ||  || align=right | 2.8 km || 
|-id=069 bgcolor=#d6d6d6
| 609069 ||  || — || October 4, 2004 || Kitt Peak || Spacewatch ||  || align=right | 2.5 km || 
|-id=070 bgcolor=#d6d6d6
| 609070 ||  || — || October 5, 2004 || Kitt Peak || Spacewatch ||  || align=right | 2.3 km || 
|-id=071 bgcolor=#d6d6d6
| 609071 ||  || — || October 5, 2004 || Kitt Peak || Spacewatch ||  || align=right | 2.0 km || 
|-id=072 bgcolor=#E9E9E9
| 609072 ||  || — || October 6, 2004 || Kitt Peak || Spacewatch ||  || align=right data-sort-value="0.66" | 660 m || 
|-id=073 bgcolor=#d6d6d6
| 609073 ||  || — || October 6, 2004 || Kitt Peak || Spacewatch ||  || align=right | 2.3 km || 
|-id=074 bgcolor=#E9E9E9
| 609074 ||  || — || October 6, 2004 || Kitt Peak || Spacewatch ||  || align=right data-sort-value="0.61" | 610 m || 
|-id=075 bgcolor=#fefefe
| 609075 ||  || — || October 7, 2004 || Kitt Peak || Spacewatch ||  || align=right data-sort-value="0.54" | 540 m || 
|-id=076 bgcolor=#d6d6d6
| 609076 ||  || — || October 5, 2004 || Kitt Peak || Spacewatch ||  || align=right | 2.2 km || 
|-id=077 bgcolor=#E9E9E9
| 609077 ||  || — || October 5, 2004 || Kitt Peak || Spacewatch ||  || align=right data-sort-value="0.68" | 680 m || 
|-id=078 bgcolor=#d6d6d6
| 609078 ||  || — || October 5, 2004 || Kitt Peak || Spacewatch ||  || align=right | 2.0 km || 
|-id=079 bgcolor=#d6d6d6
| 609079 ||  || — || October 5, 2004 || Kitt Peak || Spacewatch ||  || align=right | 3.2 km || 
|-id=080 bgcolor=#d6d6d6
| 609080 ||  || — || September 14, 2004 || Socorro || LINEAR ||  || align=right | 2.9 km || 
|-id=081 bgcolor=#d6d6d6
| 609081 ||  || — || October 5, 2004 || Kitt Peak || Spacewatch ||  || align=right | 2.4 km || 
|-id=082 bgcolor=#E9E9E9
| 609082 ||  || — || October 6, 2004 || Kitt Peak || Spacewatch ||  || align=right | 1.1 km || 
|-id=083 bgcolor=#d6d6d6
| 609083 ||  || — || October 7, 2004 || Kitt Peak || Spacewatch ||  || align=right | 2.4 km || 
|-id=084 bgcolor=#d6d6d6
| 609084 ||  || — || October 8, 2004 || Socorro || LINEAR ||  || align=right | 3.5 km || 
|-id=085 bgcolor=#d6d6d6
| 609085 ||  || — || October 2, 1999 || Kitt Peak || Spacewatch || TEL || align=right | 1.9 km || 
|-id=086 bgcolor=#d6d6d6
| 609086 ||  || — || October 4, 2004 || Kitt Peak || Spacewatch || THM || align=right | 2.1 km || 
|-id=087 bgcolor=#E9E9E9
| 609087 ||  || — || October 6, 2004 || Kitt Peak || Spacewatch ||  || align=right data-sort-value="0.68" | 680 m || 
|-id=088 bgcolor=#d6d6d6
| 609088 ||  || — || September 23, 2004 || Kitt Peak || Spacewatch ||  || align=right | 2.7 km || 
|-id=089 bgcolor=#d6d6d6
| 609089 ||  || — || September 22, 2004 || Kitt Peak || Spacewatch ||  || align=right | 1.3 km || 
|-id=090 bgcolor=#d6d6d6
| 609090 ||  || — || September 10, 2004 || Kitt Peak || Spacewatch ||  || align=right | 1.9 km || 
|-id=091 bgcolor=#d6d6d6
| 609091 ||  || — || September 9, 2004 || Kitt Peak || Spacewatch ||  || align=right | 2.6 km || 
|-id=092 bgcolor=#d6d6d6
| 609092 ||  || — || October 6, 2004 || Kitt Peak || Spacewatch ||  || align=right | 2.4 km || 
|-id=093 bgcolor=#d6d6d6
| 609093 ||  || — || September 23, 2004 || Kitt Peak || Spacewatch || EOS || align=right | 1.4 km || 
|-id=094 bgcolor=#d6d6d6
| 609094 ||  || — || October 6, 2004 || Kitt Peak || Spacewatch ||  || align=right | 2.2 km || 
|-id=095 bgcolor=#d6d6d6
| 609095 ||  || — || October 7, 2004 || Kitt Peak || Spacewatch ||  || align=right | 2.2 km || 
|-id=096 bgcolor=#d6d6d6
| 609096 ||  || — || October 4, 2004 || Kitt Peak || Spacewatch ||  || align=right | 2.5 km || 
|-id=097 bgcolor=#d6d6d6
| 609097 ||  || — || October 7, 2004 || Kitt Peak || Spacewatch || EOS || align=right | 1.3 km || 
|-id=098 bgcolor=#d6d6d6
| 609098 ||  || — || October 7, 2004 || Kitt Peak || Spacewatch ||  || align=right | 1.9 km || 
|-id=099 bgcolor=#d6d6d6
| 609099 ||  || — || October 7, 2004 || Kitt Peak || Spacewatch ||  || align=right | 2.2 km || 
|-id=100 bgcolor=#d6d6d6
| 609100 ||  || — || September 10, 2004 || Kitt Peak || Spacewatch ||  || align=right | 2.4 km || 
|}

609101–609200 

|-bgcolor=#d6d6d6
| 609101 ||  || — || October 7, 2004 || Kitt Peak || Spacewatch ||  || align=right | 2.7 km || 
|-id=102 bgcolor=#d6d6d6
| 609102 ||  || — || October 7, 2004 || Kitt Peak || Spacewatch || LIX || align=right | 2.3 km || 
|-id=103 bgcolor=#d6d6d6
| 609103 ||  || — || October 7, 2004 || Kitt Peak || Spacewatch ||  || align=right | 3.2 km || 
|-id=104 bgcolor=#d6d6d6
| 609104 ||  || — || October 7, 2004 || Kitt Peak || Spacewatch ||  || align=right | 2.1 km || 
|-id=105 bgcolor=#d6d6d6
| 609105 ||  || — || October 7, 2004 || Kitt Peak || Spacewatch ||  || align=right | 2.5 km || 
|-id=106 bgcolor=#d6d6d6
| 609106 ||  || — || October 7, 2004 || Kitt Peak || Spacewatch ||  || align=right | 2.8 km || 
|-id=107 bgcolor=#d6d6d6
| 609107 ||  || — || September 15, 2004 || Kitt Peak || Spacewatch ||  || align=right | 2.8 km || 
|-id=108 bgcolor=#d6d6d6
| 609108 ||  || — || October 8, 2004 || Kitt Peak || Spacewatch ||  || align=right | 2.4 km || 
|-id=109 bgcolor=#d6d6d6
| 609109 ||  || — || September 17, 2004 || Kitt Peak || Spacewatch ||  || align=right | 2.7 km || 
|-id=110 bgcolor=#d6d6d6
| 609110 ||  || — || October 8, 2004 || Socorro || LINEAR ||  || align=right | 2.9 km || 
|-id=111 bgcolor=#E9E9E9
| 609111 ||  || — || October 8, 2004 || Kitt Peak || Spacewatch ||  || align=right data-sort-value="0.75" | 750 m || 
|-id=112 bgcolor=#d6d6d6
| 609112 ||  || — || October 8, 2004 || Kitt Peak || Spacewatch ||  || align=right | 2.0 km || 
|-id=113 bgcolor=#d6d6d6
| 609113 ||  || — || November 10, 1993 || Kitt Peak || Spacewatch ||  || align=right | 2.8 km || 
|-id=114 bgcolor=#d6d6d6
| 609114 ||  || — || October 8, 2004 || Kitt Peak || Spacewatch ||  || align=right | 2.5 km || 
|-id=115 bgcolor=#d6d6d6
| 609115 ||  || — || October 8, 2004 || Kitt Peak || Spacewatch ||  || align=right | 2.1 km || 
|-id=116 bgcolor=#d6d6d6
| 609116 ||  || — || October 9, 2004 || Socorro || LINEAR ||  || align=right | 2.9 km || 
|-id=117 bgcolor=#d6d6d6
| 609117 ||  || — || October 9, 2004 || Kitt Peak || Spacewatch || LIX || align=right | 3.1 km || 
|-id=118 bgcolor=#E9E9E9
| 609118 ||  || — || October 7, 2004 || Kitt Peak || Spacewatch ||  || align=right data-sort-value="0.72" | 720 m || 
|-id=119 bgcolor=#d6d6d6
| 609119 ||  || — || October 7, 2004 || Kitt Peak || Spacewatch ||  || align=right | 2.1 km || 
|-id=120 bgcolor=#fefefe
| 609120 ||  || — || October 9, 2004 || Kitt Peak || Spacewatch ||  || align=right data-sort-value="0.50" | 500 m || 
|-id=121 bgcolor=#d6d6d6
| 609121 ||  || — || October 9, 2004 || Kitt Peak || Spacewatch ||  || align=right | 2.5 km || 
|-id=122 bgcolor=#E9E9E9
| 609122 ||  || — || October 9, 2004 || Kitt Peak || Spacewatch ||  || align=right data-sort-value="0.98" | 980 m || 
|-id=123 bgcolor=#d6d6d6
| 609123 ||  || — || October 9, 2004 || Kitt Peak || Spacewatch ||  || align=right | 2.6 km || 
|-id=124 bgcolor=#d6d6d6
| 609124 ||  || — || October 9, 2004 || Kitt Peak || Spacewatch ||  || align=right | 3.0 km || 
|-id=125 bgcolor=#E9E9E9
| 609125 ||  || — || October 9, 2004 || Kitt Peak || Spacewatch ||  || align=right data-sort-value="0.77" | 770 m || 
|-id=126 bgcolor=#d6d6d6
| 609126 ||  || — || October 9, 2004 || Kitt Peak || Spacewatch ||  || align=right | 2.8 km || 
|-id=127 bgcolor=#d6d6d6
| 609127 ||  || — || October 9, 2004 || Kitt Peak || Spacewatch ||  || align=right | 2.4 km || 
|-id=128 bgcolor=#d6d6d6
| 609128 ||  || — || October 9, 2004 || Kitt Peak || Spacewatch ||  || align=right | 2.3 km || 
|-id=129 bgcolor=#d6d6d6
| 609129 ||  || — || October 9, 2004 || Kitt Peak || Spacewatch ||  || align=right | 2.5 km || 
|-id=130 bgcolor=#d6d6d6
| 609130 ||  || — || October 9, 2004 || Kitt Peak || Spacewatch ||  || align=right | 2.4 km || 
|-id=131 bgcolor=#d6d6d6
| 609131 ||  || — || October 13, 2004 || Kitt Peak || Spacewatch ||  || align=right | 2.4 km || 
|-id=132 bgcolor=#d6d6d6
| 609132 ||  || — || October 8, 2004 || Kitt Peak || Spacewatch ||  || align=right | 3.2 km || 
|-id=133 bgcolor=#d6d6d6
| 609133 ||  || — || October 10, 2004 || Kitt Peak || Spacewatch ||  || align=right | 2.4 km || 
|-id=134 bgcolor=#d6d6d6
| 609134 ||  || — || October 10, 2004 || Kitt Peak || Spacewatch ||  || align=right | 2.8 km || 
|-id=135 bgcolor=#d6d6d6
| 609135 ||  || — || October 12, 2004 || Anderson Mesa || LONEOS ||  || align=right | 2.6 km || 
|-id=136 bgcolor=#d6d6d6
| 609136 ||  || — || October 13, 2004 || Kitt Peak || Spacewatch ||  || align=right | 2.5 km || 
|-id=137 bgcolor=#d6d6d6
| 609137 ||  || — || October 4, 2004 || Kitt Peak || Spacewatch ||  || align=right | 2.3 km || 
|-id=138 bgcolor=#E9E9E9
| 609138 ||  || — || September 23, 2004 || Kitt Peak || Spacewatch ||  || align=right | 1.2 km || 
|-id=139 bgcolor=#E9E9E9
| 609139 ||  || — || October 5, 1996 || Kitt Peak || Spacewatch ||  || align=right data-sort-value="0.84" | 840 m || 
|-id=140 bgcolor=#d6d6d6
| 609140 ||  || — || October 10, 2004 || Kitt Peak || Spacewatch ||  || align=right | 2.2 km || 
|-id=141 bgcolor=#d6d6d6
| 609141 ||  || — || October 10, 2004 || Socorro || LINEAR ||  || align=right | 4.5 km || 
|-id=142 bgcolor=#d6d6d6
| 609142 ||  || — || October 12, 1999 || Kitt Peak || Spacewatch ||  || align=right | 2.0 km || 
|-id=143 bgcolor=#d6d6d6
| 609143 ||  || — || September 10, 2004 || Kitt Peak || Spacewatch ||  || align=right | 2.1 km || 
|-id=144 bgcolor=#d6d6d6
| 609144 ||  || — || October 11, 2004 || Kitt Peak || Spacewatch ||  || align=right | 2.0 km || 
|-id=145 bgcolor=#fefefe
| 609145 ||  || — || October 11, 2004 || Kitt Peak || Spacewatch ||  || align=right data-sort-value="0.45" | 450 m || 
|-id=146 bgcolor=#E9E9E9
| 609146 ||  || — || October 14, 2004 || Palomar || NEAT ||  || align=right | 1.1 km || 
|-id=147 bgcolor=#d6d6d6
| 609147 ||  || — || October 14, 2004 || Palomar || NEAT ||  || align=right | 3.6 km || 
|-id=148 bgcolor=#E9E9E9
| 609148 ||  || — || May 22, 2003 || Kitt Peak || Spacewatch ||  || align=right | 1.2 km || 
|-id=149 bgcolor=#d6d6d6
| 609149 ||  || — || October 9, 2004 || Kitt Peak || Spacewatch ||  || align=right | 2.6 km || 
|-id=150 bgcolor=#d6d6d6
| 609150 ||  || — || October 10, 2004 || Kitt Peak || Spacewatch ||  || align=right | 3.0 km || 
|-id=151 bgcolor=#d6d6d6
| 609151 ||  || — || August 23, 2004 || Kitt Peak || Spacewatch ||  || align=right | 2.0 km || 
|-id=152 bgcolor=#d6d6d6
| 609152 ||  || — || October 15, 2004 || Kitt Peak || Spacewatch ||  || align=right | 2.9 km || 
|-id=153 bgcolor=#d6d6d6
| 609153 ||  || — || October 15, 2004 || Mount Lemmon || Mount Lemmon Survey ||  || align=right | 2.6 km || 
|-id=154 bgcolor=#d6d6d6
| 609154 ||  || — || October 15, 2004 || Mount Lemmon || Mount Lemmon Survey ||  || align=right | 3.3 km || 
|-id=155 bgcolor=#E9E9E9
| 609155 ||  || — || October 7, 2004 || Kitt Peak || Spacewatch ||  || align=right | 1.2 km || 
|-id=156 bgcolor=#d6d6d6
| 609156 ||  || — || September 25, 2012 || Kitt Peak || Spacewatch || 3:2 || align=right | 4.1 km || 
|-id=157 bgcolor=#E9E9E9
| 609157 ||  || — || November 12, 2013 || Mount Lemmon || Mount Lemmon Survey ||  || align=right | 1.2 km || 
|-id=158 bgcolor=#E9E9E9
| 609158 ||  || — || August 23, 2008 || Siding Spring || SSS ||  || align=right | 1.2 km || 
|-id=159 bgcolor=#d6d6d6
| 609159 ||  || — || April 18, 2007 || Mount Lemmon || Mount Lemmon Survey ||  || align=right | 2.3 km || 
|-id=160 bgcolor=#E9E9E9
| 609160 ||  || — || October 2, 2008 || Kitt Peak || Spacewatch ||  || align=right data-sort-value="0.72" | 720 m || 
|-id=161 bgcolor=#fefefe
| 609161 ||  || — || October 15, 2004 || Kitt Peak || M. W. Buie, D. E. Trilling ||  || align=right data-sort-value="0.62" | 620 m || 
|-id=162 bgcolor=#d6d6d6
| 609162 ||  || — || March 10, 2007 || Kitt Peak || Spacewatch ||  || align=right | 2.7 km || 
|-id=163 bgcolor=#d6d6d6
| 609163 ||  || — || September 23, 2009 || Mount Lemmon || Mount Lemmon Survey ||  || align=right | 2.4 km || 
|-id=164 bgcolor=#d6d6d6
| 609164 ||  || — || October 10, 2004 || Kitt Peak || Spacewatch ||  || align=right | 2.9 km || 
|-id=165 bgcolor=#E9E9E9
| 609165 ||  || — || October 20, 2016 || Mount Lemmon || Mount Lemmon Survey ||  || align=right data-sort-value="0.99" | 990 m || 
|-id=166 bgcolor=#E9E9E9
| 609166 ||  || — || September 21, 2008 || Kitt Peak || Spacewatch ||  || align=right data-sort-value="0.91" | 910 m || 
|-id=167 bgcolor=#d6d6d6
| 609167 ||  || — || October 8, 2015 || Haleakala || Pan-STARRS ||  || align=right | 2.3 km || 
|-id=168 bgcolor=#d6d6d6
| 609168 ||  || — || February 19, 2012 || Kitt Peak || Spacewatch ||  || align=right | 2.5 km || 
|-id=169 bgcolor=#E9E9E9
| 609169 ||  || — || September 10, 2012 || Crni Vrh || S. Matičič ||  || align=right data-sort-value="0.93" | 930 m || 
|-id=170 bgcolor=#d6d6d6
| 609170 ||  || — || October 9, 2004 || Kitt Peak || Spacewatch ||  || align=right | 2.0 km || 
|-id=171 bgcolor=#d6d6d6
| 609171 ||  || — || October 2, 2015 || Mount Lemmon || Mount Lemmon Survey ||  || align=right | 1.9 km || 
|-id=172 bgcolor=#E9E9E9
| 609172 ||  || — || September 4, 2008 || Kitt Peak || Spacewatch ||  || align=right data-sort-value="0.99" | 990 m || 
|-id=173 bgcolor=#d6d6d6
| 609173 ||  || — || October 24, 2015 || Mount Lemmon || Mount Lemmon Survey ||  || align=right | 2.1 km || 
|-id=174 bgcolor=#E9E9E9
| 609174 ||  || — || January 10, 2014 || Mount Lemmon || Mount Lemmon Survey ||  || align=right data-sort-value="0.71" | 710 m || 
|-id=175 bgcolor=#E9E9E9
| 609175 ||  || — || February 25, 2015 || Haleakala || Pan-STARRS ||  || align=right | 1.0 km || 
|-id=176 bgcolor=#d6d6d6
| 609176 ||  || — || October 7, 2004 || Kitt Peak || Spacewatch ||  || align=right | 1.7 km || 
|-id=177 bgcolor=#d6d6d6
| 609177 ||  || — || October 15, 2004 || Mount Lemmon || Mount Lemmon Survey ||  || align=right | 2.5 km || 
|-id=178 bgcolor=#d6d6d6
| 609178 ||  || — || April 10, 2013 || Haleakala || Pan-STARRS ||  || align=right | 2.2 km || 
|-id=179 bgcolor=#E9E9E9
| 609179 ||  || — || June 4, 2011 || Mount Lemmon || Mount Lemmon Survey ||  || align=right | 1.0 km || 
|-id=180 bgcolor=#d6d6d6
| 609180 ||  || — || October 10, 2004 || Kitt Peak || Spacewatch ||  || align=right | 2.7 km || 
|-id=181 bgcolor=#E9E9E9
| 609181 ||  || — || November 21, 2017 || Haleakala || Pan-STARRS ||  || align=right data-sort-value="0.95" | 950 m || 
|-id=182 bgcolor=#E9E9E9
| 609182 ||  || — || April 18, 2015 || Haleakala || Pan-STARRS ||  || align=right data-sort-value="0.78" | 780 m || 
|-id=183 bgcolor=#d6d6d6
| 609183 ||  || — || October 2, 2015 || Kitt Peak || Spacewatch ||  || align=right | 2.2 km || 
|-id=184 bgcolor=#d6d6d6
| 609184 ||  || — || October 10, 2004 || Kitt Peak || L. H. Wasserman, J. R. Lovering ||  || align=right | 2.1 km || 
|-id=185 bgcolor=#d6d6d6
| 609185 ||  || — || October 6, 2004 || Kitt Peak || Spacewatch ||  || align=right | 1.8 km || 
|-id=186 bgcolor=#d6d6d6
| 609186 ||  || — || October 10, 2004 || Kitt Peak || Spacewatch ||  || align=right | 2.5 km || 
|-id=187 bgcolor=#d6d6d6
| 609187 ||  || — || October 8, 2004 || Kitt Peak || Spacewatch ||  || align=right | 2.1 km || 
|-id=188 bgcolor=#E9E9E9
| 609188 ||  || — || October 21, 2004 || Socorro || LINEAR ||  || align=right data-sort-value="0.96" | 960 m || 
|-id=189 bgcolor=#d6d6d6
| 609189 ||  || — || October 8, 2015 || Haleakala || Pan-STARRS ||  || align=right | 2.4 km || 
|-id=190 bgcolor=#E9E9E9
| 609190 ||  || — || October 6, 2016 || Haleakala || Pan-STARRS ||  || align=right data-sort-value="0.76" | 760 m || 
|-id=191 bgcolor=#d6d6d6
| 609191 ||  || — || October 8, 2004 || Socorro || LINEAR || EUP || align=right | 3.9 km || 
|-id=192 bgcolor=#d6d6d6
| 609192 ||  || — || October 10, 2004 || Kitt Peak || Spacewatch ||  || align=right | 2.5 km || 
|-id=193 bgcolor=#E9E9E9
| 609193 ||  || — || November 3, 2004 || Catalina || CSS ||  || align=right | 1.1 km || 
|-id=194 bgcolor=#E9E9E9
| 609194 ||  || — || October 10, 2004 || Kitt Peak || Spacewatch ||  || align=right data-sort-value="0.88" | 880 m || 
|-id=195 bgcolor=#d6d6d6
| 609195 ||  || — || November 4, 2004 || Kitt Peak || Spacewatch ||  || align=right | 2.2 km || 
|-id=196 bgcolor=#d6d6d6
| 609196 ||  || — || October 10, 2004 || Kitt Peak || Spacewatch ||  || align=right | 2.7 km || 
|-id=197 bgcolor=#E9E9E9
| 609197 ||  || — || October 15, 2004 || Mount Lemmon || Mount Lemmon Survey ||  || align=right | 1.2 km || 
|-id=198 bgcolor=#fefefe
| 609198 ||  || — || November 4, 2004 || Kitt Peak || Spacewatch ||  || align=right data-sort-value="0.63" | 630 m || 
|-id=199 bgcolor=#d6d6d6
| 609199 ||  || — || November 4, 2004 || Kitt Peak || Spacewatch ||  || align=right | 2.3 km || 
|-id=200 bgcolor=#d6d6d6
| 609200 ||  || — || November 4, 2004 || Kitt Peak || Spacewatch ||  || align=right | 2.3 km || 
|}

609201–609300 

|-bgcolor=#E9E9E9
| 609201 ||  || — || November 4, 2004 || Kitt Peak || Spacewatch ||  || align=right | 1.2 km || 
|-id=202 bgcolor=#d6d6d6
| 609202 ||  || — || November 4, 2004 || Kitt Peak || Spacewatch ||  || align=right | 2.8 km || 
|-id=203 bgcolor=#E9E9E9
| 609203 ||  || — || November 4, 2004 || Kitt Peak || Spacewatch ||  || align=right data-sort-value="0.67" | 670 m || 
|-id=204 bgcolor=#E9E9E9
| 609204 ||  || — || November 4, 2004 || Kitt Peak || Spacewatch ||  || align=right | 1.1 km || 
|-id=205 bgcolor=#d6d6d6
| 609205 ||  || — || October 15, 2004 || Kitt Peak || Spacewatch ||  || align=right | 2.1 km || 
|-id=206 bgcolor=#d6d6d6
| 609206 ||  || — || November 5, 2004 || Palomar || NEAT || Tj (2.93) || align=right | 4.1 km || 
|-id=207 bgcolor=#d6d6d6
| 609207 ||  || — || November 3, 2004 || Kitt Peak || Spacewatch ||  || align=right | 2.5 km || 
|-id=208 bgcolor=#E9E9E9
| 609208 ||  || — || July 14, 1999 || Socorro || LINEAR ||  || align=right | 1.6 km || 
|-id=209 bgcolor=#d6d6d6
| 609209 ||  || — || November 10, 2004 || Kitt Peak || Spacewatch ||  || align=right | 2.8 km || 
|-id=210 bgcolor=#fefefe
| 609210 ||  || — || October 10, 2004 || Kitt Peak || L. H. Wasserman, J. R. Lovering ||  || align=right data-sort-value="0.56" | 560 m || 
|-id=211 bgcolor=#d6d6d6
| 609211 ||  || — || November 10, 2004 || Kitt Peak || Spacewatch ||  || align=right | 2.5 km || 
|-id=212 bgcolor=#d6d6d6
| 609212 ||  || — || November 11, 2004 || Kitt Peak || Spacewatch ||  || align=right | 2.6 km || 
|-id=213 bgcolor=#d6d6d6
| 609213 ||  || — || November 11, 2004 || Kitt Peak || Spacewatch ||  || align=right | 3.0 km || 
|-id=214 bgcolor=#d6d6d6
| 609214 ||  || — || November 11, 2004 || Kitt Peak || Spacewatch ||  || align=right | 2.5 km || 
|-id=215 bgcolor=#d6d6d6
| 609215 ||  || — || November 10, 2004 || Kitt Peak || M. W. Buie, L. H. Wasserman ||  || align=right | 2.2 km || 
|-id=216 bgcolor=#E9E9E9
| 609216 ||  || — || November 9, 2004 || Mauna Kea || Mauna Kea Obs. ||  || align=right data-sort-value="0.76" | 760 m || 
|-id=217 bgcolor=#d6d6d6
| 609217 ||  || — || November 3, 2004 || Kitt Peak || Spacewatch ||  || align=right | 2.3 km || 
|-id=218 bgcolor=#d6d6d6
| 609218 ||  || — || November 9, 2004 || Mauna Kea || Mauna Kea Obs. ||  || align=right | 2.1 km || 
|-id=219 bgcolor=#d6d6d6
| 609219 ||  || — || November 3, 2004 || Kitt Peak || Spacewatch ||  || align=right | 1.6 km || 
|-id=220 bgcolor=#d6d6d6
| 609220 ||  || — || November 11, 2004 || Kitt Peak || Kitt Peak Obs. ||  || align=right | 2.1 km || 
|-id=221 bgcolor=#C2E0FF
| 609221 ||  || — || November 9, 2004 || Mauna Kea || J. J. Kavelaars || cubewano (cold)critical || align=right | 259 km || 
|-id=222 bgcolor=#C2E0FF
| 609222 ||  || — || November 9, 2004 || Mauna Kea || J. J. Kavelaars || cubewano (cold)critical || align=right | 218 km || 
|-id=223 bgcolor=#d6d6d6
| 609223 ||  || — || April 18, 2007 || Kitt Peak || Spacewatch ||  || align=right | 2.8 km || 
|-id=224 bgcolor=#E9E9E9
| 609224 ||  || — || February 28, 2014 || Oukaimeden || C. Rinner ||  || align=right | 1.0 km || 
|-id=225 bgcolor=#d6d6d6
| 609225 ||  || — || October 14, 2009 || Mount Lemmon || Mount Lemmon Survey ||  || align=right | 2.5 km || 
|-id=226 bgcolor=#E9E9E9
| 609226 ||  || — || October 25, 2008 || Mount Lemmon || Mount Lemmon Survey ||  || align=right data-sort-value="0.72" | 720 m || 
|-id=227 bgcolor=#E9E9E9
| 609227 ||  || — || October 22, 2008 || Kitt Peak || Spacewatch ||  || align=right data-sort-value="0.97" | 970 m || 
|-id=228 bgcolor=#E9E9E9
| 609228 ||  || — || September 26, 2008 || Kitt Peak || Spacewatch ||  || align=right | 1.5 km || 
|-id=229 bgcolor=#E9E9E9
| 609229 ||  || — || October 17, 2012 || Mount Lemmon || Mount Lemmon Survey ||  || align=right | 1.1 km || 
|-id=230 bgcolor=#fefefe
| 609230 ||  || — || May 16, 2013 || Mount Lemmon || Mount Lemmon Survey ||  || align=right data-sort-value="0.62" | 620 m || 
|-id=231 bgcolor=#d6d6d6
| 609231 ||  || — || November 13, 2015 || Mount Lemmon || Mount Lemmon Survey ||  || align=right | 2.4 km || 
|-id=232 bgcolor=#fefefe
| 609232 ||  || — || November 11, 2004 || Kitt Peak || Spacewatch ||  || align=right data-sort-value="0.70" | 700 m || 
|-id=233 bgcolor=#d6d6d6
| 609233 ||  || — || February 25, 2007 || Mount Lemmon || Mount Lemmon Survey ||  || align=right | 2.3 km || 
|-id=234 bgcolor=#d6d6d6
| 609234 ||  || — || January 4, 2011 || Mount Lemmon || Mount Lemmon Survey ||  || align=right | 2.1 km || 
|-id=235 bgcolor=#d6d6d6
| 609235 ||  || — || November 14, 2010 || Mount Lemmon || Mount Lemmon Survey ||  || align=right | 2.1 km || 
|-id=236 bgcolor=#E9E9E9
| 609236 ||  || — || October 28, 2008 || Mount Lemmon || Mount Lemmon Survey ||  || align=right | 1.1 km || 
|-id=237 bgcolor=#d6d6d6
| 609237 ||  || — || April 19, 2007 || Mount Lemmon || Mount Lemmon Survey ||  || align=right | 2.0 km || 
|-id=238 bgcolor=#d6d6d6
| 609238 ||  || — || October 15, 2004 || Mount Lemmon || Mount Lemmon Survey ||  || align=right | 2.4 km || 
|-id=239 bgcolor=#E9E9E9
| 609239 ||  || — || November 20, 2004 || Kitt Peak || Spacewatch ||  || align=right | 1.2 km || 
|-id=240 bgcolor=#E9E9E9
| 609240 ||  || — || November 10, 2004 || Kitt Peak || Spacewatch ||  || align=right data-sort-value="0.99" | 990 m || 
|-id=241 bgcolor=#d6d6d6
| 609241 ||  || — || November 20, 2004 || Kitt Peak || Spacewatch ||  || align=right | 3.7 km || 
|-id=242 bgcolor=#E9E9E9
| 609242 ||  || — || October 23, 2008 || Kitt Peak || Spacewatch ||  || align=right | 1.0 km || 
|-id=243 bgcolor=#d6d6d6
| 609243 ||  || — || November 17, 2004 || Campo Imperatore || CINEOS ||  || align=right | 2.3 km || 
|-id=244 bgcolor=#d6d6d6
| 609244 ||  || — || December 10, 2010 || Mount Lemmon || Mount Lemmon Survey ||  || align=right | 2.5 km || 
|-id=245 bgcolor=#d6d6d6
| 609245 ||  || — || November 20, 2004 || Kitt Peak || Spacewatch ||  || align=right | 3.2 km || 
|-id=246 bgcolor=#E9E9E9
| 609246 ||  || — || November 20, 2004 || Kitt Peak || Spacewatch ||  || align=right data-sort-value="0.78" | 780 m || 
|-id=247 bgcolor=#E9E9E9
| 609247 ||  || — || November 20, 2004 || Kitt Peak || Spacewatch ||  || align=right data-sort-value="0.93" | 930 m || 
|-id=248 bgcolor=#d6d6d6
| 609248 ||  || — || December 5, 2004 || Klet || M. Tichý, J. Tichá ||  || align=right | 3.1 km || 
|-id=249 bgcolor=#d6d6d6
| 609249 ||  || — || December 9, 2004 || Kitt Peak || Spacewatch ||  || align=right | 3.0 km || 
|-id=250 bgcolor=#d6d6d6
| 609250 ||  || — || December 2, 2004 || Palomar || NEAT ||  || align=right | 2.0 km || 
|-id=251 bgcolor=#fefefe
| 609251 ||  || — || December 9, 2004 || Kitt Peak || Spacewatch ||  || align=right data-sort-value="0.58" | 580 m || 
|-id=252 bgcolor=#E9E9E9
| 609252 ||  || — || July 24, 2003 || Palomar || NEAT ||  || align=right | 1.2 km || 
|-id=253 bgcolor=#E9E9E9
| 609253 ||  || — || December 10, 2004 || Kitt Peak || Spacewatch ||  || align=right | 1.2 km || 
|-id=254 bgcolor=#d6d6d6
| 609254 ||  || — || December 10, 2004 || Kitt Peak || Spacewatch ||  || align=right | 3.0 km || 
|-id=255 bgcolor=#E9E9E9
| 609255 ||  || — || December 14, 2004 || Campo Imperatore || CINEOS || BAR || align=right data-sort-value="0.99" | 990 m || 
|-id=256 bgcolor=#d6d6d6
| 609256 ||  || — || December 11, 2004 || Kitt Peak || Spacewatch ||  || align=right | 2.5 km || 
|-id=257 bgcolor=#d6d6d6
| 609257 ||  || — || December 11, 2004 || Kitt Peak || Spacewatch ||  || align=right | 2.7 km || 
|-id=258 bgcolor=#d6d6d6
| 609258 ||  || — || December 11, 2004 || Kitt Peak || Spacewatch ||  || align=right | 3.9 km || 
|-id=259 bgcolor=#d6d6d6
| 609259 ||  || — || December 11, 2004 || Kitt Peak || Spacewatch ||  || align=right | 2.7 km || 
|-id=260 bgcolor=#E9E9E9
| 609260 ||  || — || December 11, 2004 || Kitt Peak || Spacewatch ||  || align=right | 1.0 km || 
|-id=261 bgcolor=#fefefe
| 609261 ||  || — || December 11, 2004 || Kitt Peak || Spacewatch ||  || align=right data-sort-value="0.67" | 670 m || 
|-id=262 bgcolor=#d6d6d6
| 609262 ||  || — || December 12, 2004 || Kitt Peak || Spacewatch ||  || align=right | 2.6 km || 
|-id=263 bgcolor=#d6d6d6
| 609263 ||  || — || July 28, 2003 || Palomar || NEAT ||  || align=right | 4.7 km || 
|-id=264 bgcolor=#E9E9E9
| 609264 ||  || — || December 11, 2004 || Kitt Peak || Spacewatch ||  || align=right | 1.8 km || 
|-id=265 bgcolor=#d6d6d6
| 609265 ||  || — || December 11, 2004 || Kitt Peak || Spacewatch ||  || align=right | 2.7 km || 
|-id=266 bgcolor=#E9E9E9
| 609266 ||  || — || December 12, 2004 || Kitt Peak || Spacewatch ||  || align=right data-sort-value="0.83" | 830 m || 
|-id=267 bgcolor=#E9E9E9
| 609267 ||  || — || December 12, 2004 || Kitt Peak || Spacewatch ||  || align=right | 1.2 km || 
|-id=268 bgcolor=#E9E9E9
| 609268 ||  || — || December 14, 2004 || Socorro || LINEAR ||  || align=right | 1.2 km || 
|-id=269 bgcolor=#E9E9E9
| 609269 ||  || — || December 15, 2004 || Socorro || LINEAR ||  || align=right | 1.9 km || 
|-id=270 bgcolor=#E9E9E9
| 609270 ||  || — || December 15, 2004 || Socorro || LINEAR ||  || align=right | 1.4 km || 
|-id=271 bgcolor=#d6d6d6
| 609271 ||  || — || December 13, 2004 || Kitt Peak || Spacewatch ||  || align=right | 3.2 km || 
|-id=272 bgcolor=#d6d6d6
| 609272 ||  || — || December 14, 2004 || Kitt Peak || Spacewatch ||  || align=right | 2.9 km || 
|-id=273 bgcolor=#fefefe
| 609273 ||  || — || December 15, 2004 || Kitt Peak || Spacewatch ||  || align=right data-sort-value="0.53" | 530 m || 
|-id=274 bgcolor=#d6d6d6
| 609274 ||  || — || September 19, 2003 || Kitt Peak || Spacewatch ||  || align=right | 2.9 km || 
|-id=275 bgcolor=#d6d6d6
| 609275 ||  || — || December 15, 2004 || Kitt Peak || Spacewatch ||  || align=right | 3.3 km || 
|-id=276 bgcolor=#d6d6d6
| 609276 ||  || — || December 15, 2004 || Kitt Peak || Spacewatch ||  || align=right | 3.0 km || 
|-id=277 bgcolor=#E9E9E9
| 609277 ||  || — || December 14, 2004 || Kitt Peak || Spacewatch ||  || align=right | 1.4 km || 
|-id=278 bgcolor=#d6d6d6
| 609278 ||  || — || December 14, 2004 || Kitt Peak || Spacewatch ||  || align=right | 3.0 km || 
|-id=279 bgcolor=#FA8072
| 609279 ||  || — || December 11, 2004 || Kitt Peak || Spacewatch ||  || align=right | 2.0 km || 
|-id=280 bgcolor=#E9E9E9
| 609280 ||  || — || December 1, 2008 || Mount Lemmon || Mount Lemmon Survey ||  || align=right | 1.2 km || 
|-id=281 bgcolor=#d6d6d6
| 609281 ||  || — || December 10, 2004 || Kitt Peak || Spacewatch ||  || align=right | 2.5 km || 
|-id=282 bgcolor=#E9E9E9
| 609282 ||  || — || December 11, 2004 || Kitt Peak || Spacewatch ||  || align=right | 1.3 km || 
|-id=283 bgcolor=#d6d6d6
| 609283 ||  || — || November 4, 2004 || Kitt Peak || Spacewatch ||  || align=right | 2.7 km || 
|-id=284 bgcolor=#fefefe
| 609284 ||  || — || December 9, 2004 || Kitt Peak || Spacewatch ||  || align=right data-sort-value="0.51" | 510 m || 
|-id=285 bgcolor=#E9E9E9
| 609285 ||  || — || December 10, 2004 || Kitt Peak || Spacewatch ||  || align=right | 1.8 km || 
|-id=286 bgcolor=#E9E9E9
| 609286 ||  || — || December 12, 2004 || Kitt Peak || Spacewatch ||  || align=right | 1.2 km || 
|-id=287 bgcolor=#d6d6d6
| 609287 ||  || — || December 15, 2004 || Mauna Kea || Mauna Kea Obs. ||  || align=right | 2.1 km || 
|-id=288 bgcolor=#fefefe
| 609288 ||  || — || October 10, 2007 || Mount Lemmon || Mount Lemmon Survey ||  || align=right data-sort-value="0.67" | 670 m || 
|-id=289 bgcolor=#E9E9E9
| 609289 ||  || — || December 12, 2004 || Kitt Peak || Spacewatch ||  || align=right | 1.5 km || 
|-id=290 bgcolor=#fefefe
| 609290 ||  || — || March 1, 2009 || Kitt Peak || Spacewatch ||  || align=right data-sort-value="0.57" | 570 m || 
|-id=291 bgcolor=#fefefe
| 609291 ||  || — || December 28, 2011 || Mount Lemmon || Mount Lemmon Survey ||  || align=right data-sort-value="0.56" | 560 m || 
|-id=292 bgcolor=#E9E9E9
| 609292 ||  || — || October 6, 2012 || Haleakala || Pan-STARRS ||  || align=right data-sort-value="0.91" | 910 m || 
|-id=293 bgcolor=#d6d6d6
| 609293 ||  || — || December 14, 2010 || Mount Lemmon || Mount Lemmon Survey ||  || align=right | 3.0 km || 
|-id=294 bgcolor=#E9E9E9
| 609294 ||  || — || September 27, 2008 || Mount Lemmon || Mount Lemmon Survey ||  || align=right data-sort-value="0.76" | 760 m || 
|-id=295 bgcolor=#d6d6d6
| 609295 ||  || — || February 10, 2011 || Catalina || CSS ||  || align=right | 3.2 km || 
|-id=296 bgcolor=#d6d6d6
| 609296 ||  || — || April 18, 2012 || Kitt Peak || Spacewatch ||  || align=right | 2.5 km || 
|-id=297 bgcolor=#E9E9E9
| 609297 ||  || — || September 30, 2008 || Mount Lemmon || Mount Lemmon Survey ||  || align=right | 1.3 km || 
|-id=298 bgcolor=#E9E9E9
| 609298 ||  || — || March 31, 2014 || Mount Lemmon || Mount Lemmon Survey ||  || align=right data-sort-value="0.80" | 800 m || 
|-id=299 bgcolor=#d6d6d6
| 609299 ||  || — || December 9, 2015 || Mount Lemmon || Mount Lemmon Survey ||  || align=right | 2.9 km || 
|-id=300 bgcolor=#E9E9E9
| 609300 ||  || — || April 12, 2015 || Haleakala || Pan-STARRS ||  || align=right | 1.2 km || 
|}

609301–609400 

|-bgcolor=#E9E9E9
| 609301 ||  || — || August 27, 2016 || Haleakala || Pan-STARRS ||  || align=right data-sort-value="0.76" | 760 m || 
|-id=302 bgcolor=#E9E9E9
| 609302 ||  || — || November 3, 2008 || Mount Lemmon || Mount Lemmon Survey ||  || align=right | 1.2 km || 
|-id=303 bgcolor=#fefefe
| 609303 ||  || — || August 31, 2014 || Haleakala || Pan-STARRS ||  || align=right data-sort-value="0.63" | 630 m || 
|-id=304 bgcolor=#fefefe
| 609304 ||  || — || January 29, 2012 || Kitt Peak || Spacewatch ||  || align=right data-sort-value="0.68" | 680 m || 
|-id=305 bgcolor=#d6d6d6
| 609305 ||  || — || December 19, 2004 || Catalina || CSS ||  || align=right | 2.6 km || 
|-id=306 bgcolor=#d6d6d6
| 609306 ||  || — || December 14, 2015 || Haleakala || Pan-STARRS ||  || align=right | 2.1 km || 
|-id=307 bgcolor=#d6d6d6
| 609307 ||  || — || December 15, 2004 || Kitt Peak || Spacewatch ||  || align=right | 2.4 km || 
|-id=308 bgcolor=#d6d6d6
| 609308 ||  || — || October 14, 1998 || Kitt Peak || Spacewatch ||  || align=right | 2.1 km || 
|-id=309 bgcolor=#E9E9E9
| 609309 ||  || — || December 19, 2004 || Mount Lemmon || Mount Lemmon Survey ||  || align=right | 1.4 km || 
|-id=310 bgcolor=#E9E9E9
| 609310 ||  || — || December 16, 2004 || Kitt Peak || Spacewatch ||  || align=right data-sort-value="0.91" | 910 m || 
|-id=311 bgcolor=#d6d6d6
| 609311 ||  || — || December 19, 2004 || Mount Lemmon || Mount Lemmon Survey ||  || align=right | 3.3 km || 
|-id=312 bgcolor=#d6d6d6
| 609312 ||  || — || December 19, 2004 || Mount Lemmon || Mount Lemmon Survey ||  || align=right | 2.2 km || 
|-id=313 bgcolor=#d6d6d6
| 609313 ||  || — || December 16, 2004 || Kitt Peak || Spacewatch ||  || align=right | 4.7 km || 
|-id=314 bgcolor=#E9E9E9
| 609314 ||  || — || December 19, 2004 || Kitt Peak || Spacewatch ||  || align=right | 1.4 km || 
|-id=315 bgcolor=#d6d6d6
| 609315 ||  || — || December 19, 2004 || Mount Lemmon || Mount Lemmon Survey ||  || align=right | 2.9 km || 
|-id=316 bgcolor=#E9E9E9
| 609316 ||  || — || December 20, 2004 || Mount Lemmon || Mount Lemmon Survey ||  || align=right | 1.5 km || 
|-id=317 bgcolor=#fefefe
| 609317 ||  || — || December 19, 2004 || Mount Lemmon || Mount Lemmon Survey ||  || align=right data-sort-value="0.52" | 520 m || 
|-id=318 bgcolor=#d6d6d6
| 609318 ||  || — || December 13, 2010 || Mauna Kea || L. Wells, M. Micheli ||  || align=right | 2.9 km || 
|-id=319 bgcolor=#E9E9E9
| 609319 ||  || — || December 20, 2004 || Mount Lemmon || Mount Lemmon Survey ||  || align=right | 1.7 km || 
|-id=320 bgcolor=#d6d6d6
| 609320 ||  || — || December 1, 2010 || Mount Lemmon || Mount Lemmon Survey ||  || align=right | 3.6 km || 
|-id=321 bgcolor=#E9E9E9
| 609321 ||  || — || October 28, 2008 || Kitt Peak || Spacewatch ||  || align=right data-sort-value="0.69" | 690 m || 
|-id=322 bgcolor=#d6d6d6
| 609322 ||  || — || August 28, 2014 || Haleakala || Pan-STARRS ||  || align=right | 3.0 km || 
|-id=323 bgcolor=#fefefe
| 609323 ||  || — || October 18, 2007 || Kitt Peak || Spacewatch ||  || align=right data-sort-value="0.54" | 540 m || 
|-id=324 bgcolor=#E9E9E9
| 609324 ||  || — || November 26, 2017 || Mount Lemmon || Mount Lemmon Survey ||  || align=right | 1.5 km || 
|-id=325 bgcolor=#fefefe
| 609325 ||  || — || September 12, 2007 || Mount Lemmon || Mount Lemmon Survey ||  || align=right data-sort-value="0.56" | 560 m || 
|-id=326 bgcolor=#d6d6d6
| 609326 ||  || — || January 30, 2017 || Haleakala || Pan-STARRS ||  || align=right | 3.1 km || 
|-id=327 bgcolor=#d6d6d6
| 609327 ||  || — || November 1, 2015 || Mount Lemmon || Mount Lemmon Survey ||  || align=right | 3.0 km || 
|-id=328 bgcolor=#d6d6d6
| 609328 ||  || — || August 28, 2014 || Haleakala || Pan-STARRS ||  || align=right | 2.4 km || 
|-id=329 bgcolor=#d6d6d6
| 609329 ||  || — || December 20, 2004 || Mount Lemmon || Mount Lemmon Survey ||  || align=right | 2.8 km || 
|-id=330 bgcolor=#d6d6d6
| 609330 ||  || — || January 6, 2005 || Catalina || CSS ||  || align=right | 3.2 km || 
|-id=331 bgcolor=#E9E9E9
| 609331 ||  || — || January 6, 2005 || Catalina || CSS ||  || align=right | 1.3 km || 
|-id=332 bgcolor=#E9E9E9
| 609332 ||  || — || December 19, 2004 || Kitt Peak || Spacewatch ||  || align=right | 1.6 km || 
|-id=333 bgcolor=#E9E9E9
| 609333 ||  || — || January 6, 2005 || Catalina || CSS ||  || align=right | 1.2 km || 
|-id=334 bgcolor=#d6d6d6
| 609334 ||  || — || January 13, 2005 || Kitt Peak || Spacewatch ||  || align=right | 3.7 km || 
|-id=335 bgcolor=#d6d6d6
| 609335 ||  || — || October 21, 2003 || Kitt Peak || Spacewatch ||  || align=right | 3.1 km || 
|-id=336 bgcolor=#d6d6d6
| 609336 ||  || — || January 13, 2005 || Kitt Peak || Spacewatch ||  || align=right | 4.6 km || 
|-id=337 bgcolor=#E9E9E9
| 609337 ||  || — || January 13, 2005 || Kitt Peak || Spacewatch ||  || align=right | 1.9 km || 
|-id=338 bgcolor=#E9E9E9
| 609338 ||  || — || January 15, 2005 || Socorro || LINEAR ||  || align=right | 1.3 km || 
|-id=339 bgcolor=#E9E9E9
| 609339 ||  || — || January 15, 2005 || Kitt Peak || Spacewatch ||  || align=right | 1.2 km || 
|-id=340 bgcolor=#E9E9E9
| 609340 ||  || — || January 15, 2005 || Kitt Peak || Spacewatch ||  || align=right | 1.7 km || 
|-id=341 bgcolor=#d6d6d6
| 609341 ||  || — || January 13, 2005 || Kitt Peak || Spacewatch ||  || align=right | 3.5 km || 
|-id=342 bgcolor=#d6d6d6
| 609342 ||  || — || December 20, 2004 || Mount Lemmon || Mount Lemmon Survey ||  || align=right | 2.9 km || 
|-id=343 bgcolor=#d6d6d6
| 609343 ||  || — || January 13, 2005 || Kitt Peak || Spacewatch ||  || align=right | 2.4 km || 
|-id=344 bgcolor=#d6d6d6
| 609344 ||  || — || January 13, 2005 || Kitt Peak || Spacewatch ||  || align=right | 2.8 km || 
|-id=345 bgcolor=#C2FFFF
| 609345 ||  || — || January 15, 2005 || Kitt Peak || Spacewatch || L5 || align=right | 8.5 km || 
|-id=346 bgcolor=#E9E9E9
| 609346 ||  || — || January 15, 2005 || Kitt Peak || Spacewatch ||  || align=right | 1.5 km || 
|-id=347 bgcolor=#fefefe
| 609347 ||  || — || January 15, 2005 || Kitt Peak || Spacewatch ||  || align=right data-sort-value="0.65" | 650 m || 
|-id=348 bgcolor=#E9E9E9
| 609348 ||  || — || January 15, 2005 || Kitt Peak || Spacewatch ||  || align=right | 1.7 km || 
|-id=349 bgcolor=#E9E9E9
| 609349 ||  || — || January 15, 2005 || Kitt Peak || Spacewatch ||  || align=right | 1.2 km || 
|-id=350 bgcolor=#fefefe
| 609350 ||  || — || January 15, 2005 || Kitt Peak || Spacewatch ||  || align=right data-sort-value="0.64" | 640 m || 
|-id=351 bgcolor=#E9E9E9
| 609351 ||  || — || January 8, 2005 || Campo Imperatore || A. Boattini, A. Di Paola ||  || align=right | 2.0 km || 
|-id=352 bgcolor=#d6d6d6
| 609352 ||  || — || January 13, 2005 || Kitt Peak || Spacewatch ||  || align=right | 4.0 km || 
|-id=353 bgcolor=#E9E9E9
| 609353 ||  || — || November 6, 2012 || Nogales || M. Schwartz, P. R. Holvorcem ||  || align=right | 1.5 km || 
|-id=354 bgcolor=#E9E9E9
| 609354 ||  || — || October 25, 2012 || Mount Lemmon || Mount Lemmon Survey ||  || align=right | 1.3 km || 
|-id=355 bgcolor=#E9E9E9
| 609355 ||  || — || January 6, 2005 || Catalina || CSS ||  || align=right | 1.8 km || 
|-id=356 bgcolor=#E9E9E9
| 609356 ||  || — || January 13, 2005 || Kitt Peak || Spacewatch ||  || align=right | 1.1 km || 
|-id=357 bgcolor=#fefefe
| 609357 ||  || — || January 13, 2005 || Kitt Peak || Spacewatch ||  || align=right data-sort-value="0.45" | 450 m || 
|-id=358 bgcolor=#d6d6d6
| 609358 ||  || — || March 31, 2012 || Mount Lemmon || Mount Lemmon Survey ||  || align=right | 3.1 km || 
|-id=359 bgcolor=#E9E9E9
| 609359 ||  || — || November 22, 2008 || Socorro || LINEAR ||  || align=right | 1.4 km || 
|-id=360 bgcolor=#E9E9E9
| 609360 ||  || — || December 20, 2004 || Mount Lemmon || Mount Lemmon Survey ||  || align=right | 1.1 km || 
|-id=361 bgcolor=#E9E9E9
| 609361 ||  || — || August 24, 2003 || Cerro Tololo || Cerro Tololo Obs. ||  || align=right | 1.4 km || 
|-id=362 bgcolor=#E9E9E9
| 609362 ||  || — || January 16, 2005 || Kitt Peak || Spacewatch ||  || align=right | 1.9 km || 
|-id=363 bgcolor=#fefefe
| 609363 ||  || — || January 16, 2005 || Uccle || P. De Cat || H || align=right data-sort-value="0.76" | 760 m || 
|-id=364 bgcolor=#E9E9E9
| 609364 ||  || — || January 16, 2005 || Socorro || LINEAR ||  || align=right | 1.6 km || 
|-id=365 bgcolor=#E9E9E9
| 609365 ||  || — || January 17, 2005 || Kitt Peak || Spacewatch ||  || align=right | 1.8 km || 
|-id=366 bgcolor=#d6d6d6
| 609366 ||  || — || January 17, 2005 || Kitt Peak || Spacewatch ||  || align=right | 2.7 km || 
|-id=367 bgcolor=#fefefe
| 609367 ||  || — || January 5, 2002 || Palomar || NEAT || H || align=right data-sort-value="0.91" | 910 m || 
|-id=368 bgcolor=#d6d6d6
| 609368 ||  || — || January 16, 2005 || Mauna Kea || Mauna Kea Obs. ||  || align=right | 3.4 km || 
|-id=369 bgcolor=#fefefe
| 609369 ||  || — || January 18, 2005 || Kitt Peak || Spacewatch ||  || align=right data-sort-value="0.64" | 640 m || 
|-id=370 bgcolor=#d6d6d6
| 609370 ||  || — || March 10, 2005 || Mount Lemmon || Mount Lemmon Survey ||  || align=right | 2.3 km || 
|-id=371 bgcolor=#E9E9E9
| 609371 ||  || — || January 15, 2005 || Kitt Peak || Spacewatch ||  || align=right | 2.0 km || 
|-id=372 bgcolor=#d6d6d6
| 609372 ||  || — || January 16, 2005 || Mauna Kea || Mauna Kea Obs. ||  || align=right | 1.9 km || 
|-id=373 bgcolor=#E9E9E9
| 609373 ||  || — || January 16, 2005 || Mauna Kea || Mauna Kea Obs. ||  || align=right | 1.3 km || 
|-id=374 bgcolor=#E9E9E9
| 609374 ||  || — || January 16, 2005 || Mauna Kea || Mauna Kea Obs. ||  || align=right | 1.5 km || 
|-id=375 bgcolor=#fefefe
| 609375 ||  || — || January 15, 2005 || Kitt Peak || Spacewatch ||  || align=right data-sort-value="0.50" | 500 m || 
|-id=376 bgcolor=#E9E9E9
| 609376 ||  || — || January 16, 2005 || Mauna Kea || Mauna Kea Obs. ||  || align=right | 1.0 km || 
|-id=377 bgcolor=#E9E9E9
| 609377 ||  || — || January 16, 2005 || Mauna Kea || Mauna Kea Obs. ||  || align=right | 1.1 km || 
|-id=378 bgcolor=#fefefe
| 609378 ||  || — || January 16, 2005 || Kitt Peak || Spacewatch ||  || align=right data-sort-value="0.83" | 830 m || 
|-id=379 bgcolor=#d6d6d6
| 609379 ||  || — || January 16, 2005 || Mauna Kea || Mauna Kea Obs. ||  || align=right | 2.6 km || 
|-id=380 bgcolor=#E9E9E9
| 609380 ||  || — || January 16, 2005 || Mauna Kea || Mauna Kea Obs. ||  || align=right | 1.1 km || 
|-id=381 bgcolor=#d6d6d6
| 609381 ||  || — || January 8, 2011 || Mount Lemmon || Mount Lemmon Survey ||  || align=right | 2.4 km || 
|-id=382 bgcolor=#fefefe
| 609382 ||  || — || August 28, 2006 || Kitt Peak || Spacewatch ||  || align=right data-sort-value="0.65" | 650 m || 
|-id=383 bgcolor=#fefefe
| 609383 ||  || — || October 17, 2007 || Mount Lemmon || Mount Lemmon Survey ||  || align=right data-sort-value="0.62" | 620 m || 
|-id=384 bgcolor=#d6d6d6
| 609384 ||  || — || October 15, 2009 || Kitt Peak || Spacewatch ||  || align=right | 2.5 km || 
|-id=385 bgcolor=#d6d6d6
| 609385 ||  || — || December 14, 2015 || Haleakala || Pan-STARRS ||  || align=right | 3.9 km || 
|-id=386 bgcolor=#E9E9E9
| 609386 ||  || — || January 16, 2005 || Kitt Peak || Spacewatch ||  || align=right | 1.3 km || 
|-id=387 bgcolor=#E9E9E9
| 609387 ||  || — || December 1, 2008 || Mount Lemmon || Mount Lemmon Survey ||  || align=right data-sort-value="0.86" | 860 m || 
|-id=388 bgcolor=#d6d6d6
| 609388 ||  || — || January 19, 2005 || Kitt Peak || Spacewatch ||  || align=right | 3.4 km || 
|-id=389 bgcolor=#fefefe
| 609389 ||  || — || November 26, 2014 || Haleakala || Pan-STARRS ||  || align=right data-sort-value="0.57" | 570 m || 
|-id=390 bgcolor=#E9E9E9
| 609390 ||  || — || January 19, 2005 || Catalina || CSS ||  || align=right | 1.5 km || 
|-id=391 bgcolor=#d6d6d6
| 609391 ||  || — || April 30, 2012 || Kitt Peak || Spacewatch ||  || align=right | 2.6 km || 
|-id=392 bgcolor=#fefefe
| 609392 ||  || — || April 21, 2009 || Mount Lemmon || Mount Lemmon Survey ||  || align=right data-sort-value="0.57" | 570 m || 
|-id=393 bgcolor=#d6d6d6
| 609393 ||  || — || February 25, 2011 || Mount Lemmon || Mount Lemmon Survey ||  || align=right | 2.4 km || 
|-id=394 bgcolor=#E9E9E9
| 609394 ||  || — || February 27, 2014 || Nogales || M. Schwartz, P. R. Holvorcem ||  || align=right | 1.2 km || 
|-id=395 bgcolor=#E9E9E9
| 609395 ||  || — || July 11, 2016 || Haleakala || Pan-STARRS ||  || align=right | 1.3 km || 
|-id=396 bgcolor=#E9E9E9
| 609396 ||  || — || August 24, 2012 || Kitt Peak || Spacewatch ||  || align=right | 1.3 km || 
|-id=397 bgcolor=#E9E9E9
| 609397 ||  || — || January 17, 2005 || Kitt Peak || Spacewatch ||  || align=right | 1.2 km || 
|-id=398 bgcolor=#E9E9E9
| 609398 ||  || — || April 5, 2014 || Haleakala || Pan-STARRS ||  || align=right | 1.3 km || 
|-id=399 bgcolor=#E9E9E9
| 609399 ||  || — || September 3, 2016 || Mount Lemmon || Mount Lemmon Survey ||  || align=right | 1.7 km || 
|-id=400 bgcolor=#fefefe
| 609400 ||  || — || March 4, 2012 || Mount Lemmon || Mount Lemmon Survey ||  || align=right data-sort-value="0.66" | 660 m || 
|}

609401–609500 

|-bgcolor=#fefefe
| 609401 ||  || — || January 18, 2012 || Mount Lemmon || Mount Lemmon Survey ||  || align=right data-sort-value="0.56" | 560 m || 
|-id=402 bgcolor=#E9E9E9
| 609402 ||  || — || February 24, 2014 || Haleakala || Pan-STARRS ||  || align=right | 1.2 km || 
|-id=403 bgcolor=#E9E9E9
| 609403 ||  || — || January 17, 2005 || Kitt Peak || Spacewatch ||  || align=right | 1.2 km || 
|-id=404 bgcolor=#E9E9E9
| 609404 ||  || — || August 1, 2016 || Haleakala || Pan-STARRS ||  || align=right | 1.1 km || 
|-id=405 bgcolor=#E9E9E9
| 609405 ||  || — || January 15, 2018 || Mount Lemmon || Mount Lemmon Survey ||  || align=right | 1.3 km || 
|-id=406 bgcolor=#d6d6d6
| 609406 ||  || — || March 7, 2017 || Mount Lemmon || Mount Lemmon Survey ||  || align=right | 2.4 km || 
|-id=407 bgcolor=#E9E9E9
| 609407 ||  || — || February 26, 2014 || Haleakala || Pan-STARRS ||  || align=right | 1.0 km || 
|-id=408 bgcolor=#E9E9E9
| 609408 ||  || — || January 18, 2005 || Kitt Peak || Spacewatch ||  || align=right data-sort-value="0.84" | 840 m || 
|-id=409 bgcolor=#E9E9E9
| 609409 ||  || — || November 19, 2008 || Mount Lemmon || Mount Lemmon Survey ||  || align=right data-sort-value="0.90" | 900 m || 
|-id=410 bgcolor=#E9E9E9
| 609410 ||  || — || January 17, 2005 || Kitt Peak || Spacewatch ||  || align=right | 1.3 km || 
|-id=411 bgcolor=#E9E9E9
| 609411 ||  || — || January 17, 2005 || Kitt Peak || Spacewatch ||  || align=right | 1.4 km || 
|-id=412 bgcolor=#E9E9E9
| 609412 ||  || — || January 15, 2005 || Kitt Peak || Spacewatch ||  || align=right | 1.7 km || 
|-id=413 bgcolor=#E9E9E9
| 609413 ||  || — || February 1, 2005 || Palomar || NEAT ||  || align=right | 1.6 km || 
|-id=414 bgcolor=#E9E9E9
| 609414 ||  || — || January 13, 2005 || Kitt Peak || Spacewatch ||  || align=right | 1.6 km || 
|-id=415 bgcolor=#d6d6d6
| 609415 ||  || — || January 6, 2005 || Catalina || CSS ||  || align=right | 2.4 km || 
|-id=416 bgcolor=#d6d6d6
| 609416 ||  || — || February 2, 2005 || Kitt Peak || Spacewatch || Tj (2.98) || align=right | 3.3 km || 
|-id=417 bgcolor=#E9E9E9
| 609417 ||  || — || February 1, 2005 || Kitt Peak || Spacewatch ||  || align=right | 1.2 km || 
|-id=418 bgcolor=#E9E9E9
| 609418 ||  || — || February 1, 2005 || Kitt Peak || Spacewatch ||  || align=right | 1.6 km || 
|-id=419 bgcolor=#fefefe
| 609419 ||  || — || February 1, 2005 || Kitt Peak || Spacewatch ||  || align=right data-sort-value="0.48" | 480 m || 
|-id=420 bgcolor=#d6d6d6
| 609420 ||  || — || January 16, 2005 || Kitt Peak || Spacewatch ||  || align=right | 2.3 km || 
|-id=421 bgcolor=#E9E9E9
| 609421 ||  || — || February 2, 2005 || Socorro || LINEAR ||  || align=right | 1.7 km || 
|-id=422 bgcolor=#E9E9E9
| 609422 ||  || — || December 20, 2004 || Mount Lemmon || Mount Lemmon Survey ||  || align=right | 1.3 km || 
|-id=423 bgcolor=#fefefe
| 609423 ||  || — || January 13, 2005 || Kitt Peak || Spacewatch ||  || align=right data-sort-value="0.62" | 620 m || 
|-id=424 bgcolor=#E9E9E9
| 609424 ||  || — || February 9, 2005 || Kitt Peak || Spacewatch ||  || align=right | 1.8 km || 
|-id=425 bgcolor=#E9E9E9
| 609425 ||  || — || February 9, 2005 || Mount Lemmon || Mount Lemmon Survey ||  || align=right | 1.2 km || 
|-id=426 bgcolor=#fefefe
| 609426 ||  || — || January 26, 2001 || Kitt Peak || Spacewatch ||  || align=right data-sort-value="0.60" | 600 m || 
|-id=427 bgcolor=#E9E9E9
| 609427 ||  || — || February 1, 2005 || Kitt Peak || Spacewatch ||  || align=right data-sort-value="0.99" | 990 m || 
|-id=428 bgcolor=#fefefe
| 609428 ||  || — || February 2, 2005 || Kitt Peak || Spacewatch ||  || align=right data-sort-value="0.56" | 560 m || 
|-id=429 bgcolor=#E9E9E9
| 609429 ||  || — || February 4, 2005 || Mount Lemmon || Mount Lemmon Survey ||  || align=right | 1.4 km || 
|-id=430 bgcolor=#d6d6d6
| 609430 ||  || — || March 13, 2011 || Mount Lemmon || Mount Lemmon Survey ||  || align=right | 2.6 km || 
|-id=431 bgcolor=#E9E9E9
| 609431 ||  || — || February 2, 2005 || Catalina || CSS ||  || align=right | 1.4 km || 
|-id=432 bgcolor=#fefefe
| 609432 ||  || — || February 2, 2005 || Kitt Peak || Spacewatch ||  || align=right data-sort-value="0.67" | 670 m || 
|-id=433 bgcolor=#E9E9E9
| 609433 ||  || — || February 9, 2005 || Kitt Peak || Spacewatch ||  || align=right | 1.8 km || 
|-id=434 bgcolor=#E9E9E9
| 609434 ||  || — || February 26, 2014 || Mount Lemmon || Mount Lemmon Survey ||  || align=right | 1.5 km || 
|-id=435 bgcolor=#E9E9E9
| 609435 ||  || — || July 10, 2016 || Mount Lemmon || Mount Lemmon Survey ||  || align=right | 1.5 km || 
|-id=436 bgcolor=#d6d6d6
| 609436 ||  || — || August 3, 2013 || Haleakala || Pan-STARRS ||  || align=right | 3.0 km || 
|-id=437 bgcolor=#E9E9E9
| 609437 ||  || — || August 27, 2016 || Haleakala || Pan-STARRS ||  || align=right | 1.2 km || 
|-id=438 bgcolor=#E9E9E9
| 609438 ||  || — || February 14, 2005 || Kitt Peak || Spacewatch ||  || align=right | 1.6 km || 
|-id=439 bgcolor=#E9E9E9
| 609439 ||  || — || October 10, 2016 || Haleakala || Pan-STARRS ||  || align=right | 1.0 km || 
|-id=440 bgcolor=#d6d6d6
| 609440 ||  || — || February 4, 2005 || Kitt Peak || Spacewatch ||  || align=right | 2.3 km || 
|-id=441 bgcolor=#d6d6d6
| 609441 ||  || — || April 5, 2011 || Catalina || CSS ||  || align=right | 2.3 km || 
|-id=442 bgcolor=#E9E9E9
| 609442 ||  || — || February 4, 2005 || Kitt Peak || Spacewatch ||  || align=right data-sort-value="0.98" | 980 m || 
|-id=443 bgcolor=#E9E9E9
| 609443 ||  || — || January 2, 2009 || Mount Lemmon || Mount Lemmon Survey ||  || align=right | 1.6 km || 
|-id=444 bgcolor=#E9E9E9
| 609444 ||  || — || October 9, 2016 || Haleakala || Pan-STARRS ||  || align=right | 1.4 km || 
|-id=445 bgcolor=#d6d6d6
| 609445 ||  || — || February 9, 2005 || Mount Lemmon || Mount Lemmon Survey ||  || align=right | 2.7 km || 
|-id=446 bgcolor=#E9E9E9
| 609446 ||  || — || January 1, 2009 || Kitt Peak || Spacewatch ||  || align=right data-sort-value="0.93" | 930 m || 
|-id=447 bgcolor=#d6d6d6
| 609447 ||  || — || February 9, 2005 || Mount Lemmon || Mount Lemmon Survey ||  || align=right | 3.1 km || 
|-id=448 bgcolor=#E9E9E9
| 609448 ||  || — || January 28, 2014 || Kitt Peak || Spacewatch ||  || align=right | 1.7 km || 
|-id=449 bgcolor=#fefefe
| 609449 ||  || — || January 19, 2012 || Haleakala || Pan-STARRS ||  || align=right data-sort-value="0.79" | 790 m || 
|-id=450 bgcolor=#fefefe
| 609450 ||  || — || November 8, 2007 || Mount Lemmon || Mount Lemmon Survey ||  || align=right data-sort-value="0.66" | 660 m || 
|-id=451 bgcolor=#d6d6d6
| 609451 ||  || — || January 27, 2017 || Haleakala || Pan-STARRS ||  || align=right | 2.4 km || 
|-id=452 bgcolor=#E9E9E9
| 609452 ||  || — || December 21, 2008 || Mount Lemmon || Mount Lemmon Survey ||  || align=right | 1.7 km || 
|-id=453 bgcolor=#E9E9E9
| 609453 ||  || — || December 21, 2008 || Mount Lemmon || Mount Lemmon Survey ||  || align=right | 1.1 km || 
|-id=454 bgcolor=#E9E9E9
| 609454 ||  || — || December 20, 2004 || Mount Lemmon || Mount Lemmon Survey ||  || align=right | 1.2 km || 
|-id=455 bgcolor=#d6d6d6
| 609455 ||  || — || February 14, 2005 || Kitt Peak || Spacewatch ||  || align=right | 2.5 km || 
|-id=456 bgcolor=#fefefe
| 609456 ||  || — || February 9, 2005 || Mount Lemmon || Mount Lemmon Survey ||  || align=right data-sort-value="0.65" | 650 m || 
|-id=457 bgcolor=#d6d6d6
| 609457 ||  || — || January 9, 2016 || Haleakala || Pan-STARRS ||  || align=right | 3.0 km || 
|-id=458 bgcolor=#E9E9E9
| 609458 ||  || — || February 4, 2005 || Mount Lemmon || Mount Lemmon Survey ||  || align=right | 1.6 km || 
|-id=459 bgcolor=#d6d6d6
| 609459 ||  || — || July 19, 2015 || Haleakala || Pan-STARRS ||  || align=right | 1.5 km || 
|-id=460 bgcolor=#FA8072
| 609460 ||  || — || March 1, 2005 || Kitt Peak || Spacewatch ||  || align=right data-sort-value="0.81" | 810 m || 
|-id=461 bgcolor=#d6d6d6
| 609461 ||  || — || March 3, 2005 || Kitt Peak || Spacewatch ||  || align=right | 2.5 km || 
|-id=462 bgcolor=#E9E9E9
| 609462 ||  || — || March 3, 2005 || Catalina || CSS ||  || align=right | 1.3 km || 
|-id=463 bgcolor=#fefefe
| 609463 ||  || — || March 3, 2005 || Catalina || CSS ||  || align=right data-sort-value="0.56" | 560 m || 
|-id=464 bgcolor=#fefefe
| 609464 ||  || — || March 3, 2005 || Catalina || CSS ||  || align=right data-sort-value="0.65" | 650 m || 
|-id=465 bgcolor=#E9E9E9
| 609465 ||  || — || March 4, 2005 || Kitt Peak || Spacewatch ||  || align=right | 1.6 km || 
|-id=466 bgcolor=#fefefe
| 609466 ||  || — || February 1, 2005 || Kitt Peak || Spacewatch ||  || align=right data-sort-value="0.67" | 670 m || 
|-id=467 bgcolor=#E9E9E9
| 609467 ||  || — || March 4, 2005 || Catalina || CSS ||  || align=right | 2.1 km || 
|-id=468 bgcolor=#fefefe
| 609468 ||  || — || March 4, 2005 || Mount Lemmon || Mount Lemmon Survey ||  || align=right data-sort-value="0.64" | 640 m || 
|-id=469 bgcolor=#d6d6d6
| 609469 ||  || — || March 4, 2005 || Mount Lemmon || Mount Lemmon Survey ||  || align=right | 3.1 km || 
|-id=470 bgcolor=#E9E9E9
| 609470 ||  || — || March 4, 2005 || Mount Lemmon || Mount Lemmon Survey ||  || align=right | 2.0 km || 
|-id=471 bgcolor=#fefefe
| 609471 ||  || — || March 3, 2005 || Kitt Peak || Spacewatch || H || align=right data-sort-value="0.40" | 400 m || 
|-id=472 bgcolor=#fefefe
| 609472 ||  || — || March 3, 2005 || Catalina || CSS ||  || align=right data-sort-value="0.74" | 740 m || 
|-id=473 bgcolor=#E9E9E9
| 609473 ||  || — || March 4, 2005 || Kitt Peak || Spacewatch ||  || align=right | 1.1 km || 
|-id=474 bgcolor=#E9E9E9
| 609474 ||  || — || February 2, 2005 || Kitt Peak || Spacewatch ||  || align=right | 1.4 km || 
|-id=475 bgcolor=#E9E9E9
| 609475 ||  || — || March 4, 2005 || Catalina || CSS ||  || align=right | 1.8 km || 
|-id=476 bgcolor=#d6d6d6
| 609476 ||  || — || February 9, 2005 || Mount Lemmon || Mount Lemmon Survey ||  || align=right | 2.4 km || 
|-id=477 bgcolor=#E9E9E9
| 609477 ||  || — || March 4, 2005 || Mount Lemmon || Mount Lemmon Survey ||  || align=right | 1.8 km || 
|-id=478 bgcolor=#fefefe
| 609478 ||  || — || March 8, 2005 || Mount Lemmon || Mount Lemmon Survey ||  || align=right data-sort-value="0.56" | 560 m || 
|-id=479 bgcolor=#E9E9E9
| 609479 ||  || — || March 4, 2005 || Mount Lemmon || Mount Lemmon Survey ||  || align=right | 1.4 km || 
|-id=480 bgcolor=#d6d6d6
| 609480 ||  || — || March 9, 2005 || Kitt Peak || Spacewatch ||  || align=right | 3.2 km || 
|-id=481 bgcolor=#E9E9E9
| 609481 ||  || — || March 9, 2005 || Mount Lemmon || Mount Lemmon Survey ||  || align=right | 1.9 km || 
|-id=482 bgcolor=#E9E9E9
| 609482 ||  || — || March 9, 2005 || Mount Lemmon || Mount Lemmon Survey ||  || align=right | 1.5 km || 
|-id=483 bgcolor=#E9E9E9
| 609483 ||  || — || March 10, 2005 || Mount Lemmon || Mount Lemmon Survey ||  || align=right | 1.6 km || 
|-id=484 bgcolor=#E9E9E9
| 609484 ||  || — || March 10, 2005 || Mount Lemmon || Mount Lemmon Survey ||  || align=right | 1.9 km || 
|-id=485 bgcolor=#fefefe
| 609485 ||  || — || March 10, 2005 || Kitt Peak || Spacewatch ||  || align=right data-sort-value="0.73" | 730 m || 
|-id=486 bgcolor=#fefefe
| 609486 ||  || — || March 8, 2005 || Mount Lemmon || Mount Lemmon Survey ||  || align=right data-sort-value="0.42" | 420 m || 
|-id=487 bgcolor=#E9E9E9
| 609487 ||  || — || March 8, 2005 || Kitt Peak || Spacewatch ||  || align=right | 1.8 km || 
|-id=488 bgcolor=#d6d6d6
| 609488 ||  || — || March 8, 2005 || Kitt Peak || Spacewatch ||  || align=right | 2.9 km || 
|-id=489 bgcolor=#E9E9E9
| 609489 ||  || — || March 10, 2005 || Catalina || CSS ||  || align=right | 1.6 km || 
|-id=490 bgcolor=#d6d6d6
| 609490 ||  || — || March 11, 2005 || Mount Lemmon || Mount Lemmon Survey ||  || align=right | 2.6 km || 
|-id=491 bgcolor=#fefefe
| 609491 ||  || — || February 16, 2005 || La Silla || A. Boattini ||  || align=right data-sort-value="0.51" | 510 m || 
|-id=492 bgcolor=#E9E9E9
| 609492 ||  || — || March 11, 2005 || Kitt Peak || Spacewatch ||  || align=right | 1.4 km || 
|-id=493 bgcolor=#E9E9E9
| 609493 ||  || — || January 17, 2005 || Kitt Peak || Spacewatch ||  || align=right | 1.4 km || 
|-id=494 bgcolor=#E9E9E9
| 609494 ||  || — || March 4, 2005 || Catalina || CSS ||  || align=right | 1.9 km || 
|-id=495 bgcolor=#E9E9E9
| 609495 ||  || — || March 4, 2005 || Kitt Peak || Spacewatch ||  || align=right | 1.6 km || 
|-id=496 bgcolor=#fefefe
| 609496 ||  || — || March 9, 2005 || Socorro || LINEAR ||  || align=right data-sort-value="0.71" | 710 m || 
|-id=497 bgcolor=#E9E9E9
| 609497 ||  || — || March 11, 2005 || Mount Lemmon || Mount Lemmon Survey ||  || align=right | 1.4 km || 
|-id=498 bgcolor=#E9E9E9
| 609498 ||  || — || March 11, 2005 || Kitt Peak || Spacewatch ||  || align=right | 1.6 km || 
|-id=499 bgcolor=#E9E9E9
| 609499 ||  || — || February 1, 2005 || Kitt Peak || Spacewatch ||  || align=right | 1.3 km || 
|-id=500 bgcolor=#fefefe
| 609500 ||  || — || March 10, 2005 || Mount Lemmon || Mount Lemmon Survey ||  || align=right data-sort-value="0.54" | 540 m || 
|}

609501–609600 

|-bgcolor=#E9E9E9
| 609501 ||  || — || October 29, 2003 || Kitt Peak || Spacewatch ||  || align=right | 1.7 km || 
|-id=502 bgcolor=#E9E9E9
| 609502 ||  || — || March 10, 2005 || Mount Lemmon || Mount Lemmon Survey ||  || align=right | 1.3 km || 
|-id=503 bgcolor=#fefefe
| 609503 ||  || — || March 11, 2005 || Catalina || CSS ||  || align=right data-sort-value="0.74" | 740 m || 
|-id=504 bgcolor=#d6d6d6
| 609504 ||  || — || March 11, 2005 || Mount Lemmon || Mount Lemmon Survey ||  || align=right | 3.1 km || 
|-id=505 bgcolor=#E9E9E9
| 609505 ||  || — || March 11, 2005 || Mount Lemmon || Mount Lemmon Survey ||  || align=right | 1.1 km || 
|-id=506 bgcolor=#E9E9E9
| 609506 ||  || — || March 11, 2005 || Mount Lemmon || Mount Lemmon Survey ||  || align=right | 1.7 km || 
|-id=507 bgcolor=#E9E9E9
| 609507 ||  || — || March 13, 2005 || Kitt Peak || Spacewatch ||  || align=right | 1.6 km || 
|-id=508 bgcolor=#d6d6d6
| 609508 ||  || — || March 2, 2005 || Catalina || CSS ||  || align=right | 4.0 km || 
|-id=509 bgcolor=#E9E9E9
| 609509 ||  || — || March 11, 2005 || Mount Lemmon || Mount Lemmon Survey ||  || align=right | 1.2 km || 
|-id=510 bgcolor=#E9E9E9
| 609510 ||  || — || March 13, 2005 || Kitt Peak || Spacewatch ||  || align=right | 2.1 km || 
|-id=511 bgcolor=#E9E9E9
| 609511 ||  || — || September 11, 2007 || Mount Lemmon || Mount Lemmon Survey ||  || align=right | 1.5 km || 
|-id=512 bgcolor=#E9E9E9
| 609512 ||  || — || April 10, 2010 || Kitt Peak || Spacewatch ||  || align=right | 1.7 km || 
|-id=513 bgcolor=#d6d6d6
| 609513 ||  || — || March 11, 2005 || Kitt Peak || M. W. Buie, L. H. Wasserman ||  || align=right | 2.5 km || 
|-id=514 bgcolor=#E9E9E9
| 609514 ||  || — || March 10, 2005 || Mount Lemmon || Mount Lemmon Survey ||  || align=right | 1.2 km || 
|-id=515 bgcolor=#d6d6d6
| 609515 ||  || — || November 20, 2003 || Kitt Peak || Spacewatch ||  || align=right | 3.3 km || 
|-id=516 bgcolor=#d6d6d6
| 609516 ||  || — || September 23, 2008 || Kitt Peak || Spacewatch ||  || align=right | 2.2 km || 
|-id=517 bgcolor=#E9E9E9
| 609517 ||  || — || March 1, 2005 || Catalina || CSS ||  || align=right | 1.3 km || 
|-id=518 bgcolor=#fefefe
| 609518 ||  || — || January 21, 2012 || Kitt Peak || Spacewatch ||  || align=right data-sort-value="0.71" | 710 m || 
|-id=519 bgcolor=#E9E9E9
| 609519 ||  || — || March 13, 2005 || Moletai || K. Černis, J. Zdanavičius ||  || align=right | 2.0 km || 
|-id=520 bgcolor=#d6d6d6
| 609520 ||  || — || March 30, 2011 || Haleakala || Pan-STARRS ||  || align=right | 2.7 km || 
|-id=521 bgcolor=#E9E9E9
| 609521 ||  || — || August 27, 2011 || Haleakala || Pan-STARRS ||  || align=right | 1.6 km || 
|-id=522 bgcolor=#E9E9E9
| 609522 ||  || — || March 12, 2014 || Haleakala || Pan-STARRS ||  || align=right | 1.3 km || 
|-id=523 bgcolor=#fefefe
| 609523 ||  || — || February 3, 2012 || Haleakala || Pan-STARRS ||  || align=right data-sort-value="0.56" | 560 m || 
|-id=524 bgcolor=#d6d6d6
| 609524 ||  || — || November 20, 2009 || Kitt Peak || Spacewatch ||  || align=right | 2.4 km || 
|-id=525 bgcolor=#fefefe
| 609525 ||  || — || April 1, 2016 || Haleakala || Pan-STARRS ||  || align=right data-sort-value="0.73" | 730 m || 
|-id=526 bgcolor=#E9E9E9
| 609526 ||  || — || February 1, 2009 || Mount Lemmon || Mount Lemmon Survey ||  || align=right | 1.4 km || 
|-id=527 bgcolor=#d6d6d6
| 609527 ||  || — || March 9, 2011 || Mount Lemmon || Mount Lemmon Survey ||  || align=right | 2.5 km || 
|-id=528 bgcolor=#E9E9E9
| 609528 ||  || — || March 3, 2005 || Kitt Peak || Spacewatch ||  || align=right | 1.3 km || 
|-id=529 bgcolor=#E9E9E9
| 609529 ||  || — || March 13, 2005 || Mount Lemmon || Mount Lemmon Survey ||  || align=right | 1.6 km || 
|-id=530 bgcolor=#E9E9E9
| 609530 ||  || — || February 27, 2014 || Haleakala || Pan-STARRS ||  || align=right | 1.6 km || 
|-id=531 bgcolor=#fefefe
| 609531 ||  || — || July 15, 2013 || Haleakala || Pan-STARRS ||  || align=right data-sort-value="0.54" | 540 m || 
|-id=532 bgcolor=#d6d6d6
| 609532 ||  || — || September 19, 2014 || Haleakala || Pan-STARRS ||  || align=right | 2.4 km || 
|-id=533 bgcolor=#fefefe
| 609533 ||  || — || July 21, 2006 || Mount Lemmon || Mount Lemmon Survey ||  || align=right data-sort-value="0.69" | 690 m || 
|-id=534 bgcolor=#fefefe
| 609534 ||  || — || March 8, 2005 || Mount Lemmon || Mount Lemmon Survey ||  || align=right data-sort-value="0.54" | 540 m || 
|-id=535 bgcolor=#fefefe
| 609535 ||  || — || September 3, 2010 || Mount Lemmon || Mount Lemmon Survey ||  || align=right data-sort-value="0.75" | 750 m || 
|-id=536 bgcolor=#fefefe
| 609536 ||  || — || February 26, 2012 || Haleakala || Pan-STARRS ||  || align=right data-sort-value="0.56" | 560 m || 
|-id=537 bgcolor=#fefefe
| 609537 ||  || — || January 10, 2016 || Haleakala || Pan-STARRS || H || align=right data-sort-value="0.57" | 570 m || 
|-id=538 bgcolor=#E9E9E9
| 609538 ||  || — || October 30, 2007 || Mount Lemmon || Mount Lemmon Survey ||  || align=right | 1.6 km || 
|-id=539 bgcolor=#E9E9E9
| 609539 ||  || — || August 10, 2016 || Haleakala || Pan-STARRS ||  || align=right | 1.8 km || 
|-id=540 bgcolor=#E9E9E9
| 609540 ||  || — || September 15, 2007 || Kitt Peak || Spacewatch ||  || align=right | 1.6 km || 
|-id=541 bgcolor=#fefefe
| 609541 ||  || — || December 9, 2015 || Haleakala || Pan-STARRS ||  || align=right data-sort-value="0.79" | 790 m || 
|-id=542 bgcolor=#E9E9E9
| 609542 ||  || — || August 27, 2011 || Haleakala || Pan-STARRS ||  || align=right | 1.9 km || 
|-id=543 bgcolor=#d6d6d6
| 609543 ||  || — || July 14, 2013 || Haleakala || Pan-STARRS ||  || align=right | 2.6 km || 
|-id=544 bgcolor=#fefefe
| 609544 ||  || — || December 18, 2007 || Kitt Peak || Spacewatch ||  || align=right data-sort-value="0.64" | 640 m || 
|-id=545 bgcolor=#fefefe
| 609545 ||  || — || April 26, 2009 || Kitt Peak || Spacewatch ||  || align=right data-sort-value="0.49" | 490 m || 
|-id=546 bgcolor=#fefefe
| 609546 ||  || — || March 8, 2005 || Mount Lemmon || Mount Lemmon Survey ||  || align=right data-sort-value="0.51" | 510 m || 
|-id=547 bgcolor=#E9E9E9
| 609547 ||  || — || January 30, 2009 || Mount Lemmon || Mount Lemmon Survey ||  || align=right | 1.3 km || 
|-id=548 bgcolor=#E9E9E9
| 609548 ||  || — || March 1, 2005 || Kitt Peak || Spacewatch ||  || align=right | 1.5 km || 
|-id=549 bgcolor=#E9E9E9
| 609549 ||  || — || March 10, 2005 || Mount Lemmon || Mount Lemmon Survey ||  || align=right | 1.7 km || 
|-id=550 bgcolor=#fefefe
| 609550 ||  || — || September 15, 2006 || Kitt Peak || Spacewatch ||  || align=right data-sort-value="0.68" | 680 m || 
|-id=551 bgcolor=#E9E9E9
| 609551 ||  || — || October 4, 2007 || Kitt Peak || Spacewatch ||  || align=right | 1.4 km || 
|-id=552 bgcolor=#fefefe
| 609552 ||  || — || November 4, 2007 || Kitt Peak || Spacewatch ||  || align=right data-sort-value="0.54" | 540 m || 
|-id=553 bgcolor=#fefefe
| 609553 ||  || — || January 29, 2012 || Kitt Peak || Spacewatch ||  || align=right data-sort-value="0.67" | 670 m || 
|-id=554 bgcolor=#fefefe
| 609554 ||  || — || March 16, 2012 || Haleakala || Pan-STARRS ||  || align=right data-sort-value="0.71" | 710 m || 
|-id=555 bgcolor=#E9E9E9
| 609555 ||  || — || March 6, 2014 || Kitt Peak || Spacewatch ||  || align=right | 1.4 km || 
|-id=556 bgcolor=#fefefe
| 609556 ||  || — || April 1, 2005 || Kitt Peak || Spacewatch ||  || align=right data-sort-value="0.71" | 710 m || 
|-id=557 bgcolor=#d6d6d6
| 609557 ||  || — || November 20, 2003 || Kitt Peak || Spacewatch ||  || align=right | 2.5 km || 
|-id=558 bgcolor=#d6d6d6
| 609558 ||  || — || March 13, 2005 || Kitt Peak || Spacewatch ||  || align=right | 2.6 km || 
|-id=559 bgcolor=#fefefe
| 609559 ||  || — || April 2, 2005 || Mount Lemmon || Mount Lemmon Survey ||  || align=right data-sort-value="0.52" | 520 m || 
|-id=560 bgcolor=#E9E9E9
| 609560 ||  || — || April 5, 2005 || Mount Lemmon || Mount Lemmon Survey ||  || align=right | 1.9 km || 
|-id=561 bgcolor=#fefefe
| 609561 ||  || — || April 2, 2005 || Mount Lemmon || Mount Lemmon Survey ||  || align=right data-sort-value="0.57" | 570 m || 
|-id=562 bgcolor=#E9E9E9
| 609562 ||  || — || April 6, 2005 || Mount Lemmon || Mount Lemmon Survey ||  || align=right | 2.0 km || 
|-id=563 bgcolor=#E9E9E9
| 609563 ||  || — || April 6, 2005 || Mount Lemmon || Mount Lemmon Survey ||  || align=right | 1.2 km || 
|-id=564 bgcolor=#fefefe
| 609564 ||  || — || April 6, 2005 || Kitt Peak || Spacewatch ||  || align=right data-sort-value="0.55" | 550 m || 
|-id=565 bgcolor=#E9E9E9
| 609565 ||  || — || March 15, 2005 || Catalina || CSS ||  || align=right | 1.4 km || 
|-id=566 bgcolor=#E9E9E9
| 609566 ||  || — || April 2, 2005 || Mount Lemmon || Mount Lemmon Survey ||  || align=right | 1.7 km || 
|-id=567 bgcolor=#E9E9E9
| 609567 ||  || — || April 4, 2005 || Mount Lemmon || Mount Lemmon Survey ||  || align=right | 1.9 km || 
|-id=568 bgcolor=#fefefe
| 609568 ||  || — || March 11, 2005 || Mount Lemmon || Mount Lemmon Survey ||  || align=right data-sort-value="0.72" | 720 m || 
|-id=569 bgcolor=#E9E9E9
| 609569 ||  || — || April 6, 2005 || Kitt Peak || Spacewatch ||  || align=right | 1.9 km || 
|-id=570 bgcolor=#E9E9E9
| 609570 ||  || — || March 16, 2005 || Catalina || CSS ||  || align=right | 1.3 km || 
|-id=571 bgcolor=#E9E9E9
| 609571 ||  || — || April 2, 2005 || Mount Lemmon || Mount Lemmon Survey ||  || align=right | 1.1 km || 
|-id=572 bgcolor=#FA8072
| 609572 ||  || — || March 18, 2005 || Catalina || CSS || H || align=right data-sort-value="0.65" | 650 m || 
|-id=573 bgcolor=#fefefe
| 609573 ||  || — || March 9, 2005 || Mount Lemmon || Mount Lemmon Survey ||  || align=right data-sort-value="0.61" | 610 m || 
|-id=574 bgcolor=#E9E9E9
| 609574 ||  || — || September 14, 2007 || Mount Lemmon || Mount Lemmon Survey ||  || align=right | 1.9 km || 
|-id=575 bgcolor=#fefefe
| 609575 ||  || — || March 11, 2005 || Mount Lemmon || Mount Lemmon Survey ||  || align=right data-sort-value="0.74" | 740 m || 
|-id=576 bgcolor=#E9E9E9
| 609576 ||  || — || April 2, 2005 || Kitt Peak || Spacewatch ||  || align=right | 2.0 km || 
|-id=577 bgcolor=#E9E9E9
| 609577 ||  || — || April 10, 2005 || Mount Lemmon || Mount Lemmon Survey ||  || align=right | 1.6 km || 
|-id=578 bgcolor=#E9E9E9
| 609578 ||  || — || April 12, 2005 || Kitt Peak || Spacewatch ||  || align=right | 1.4 km || 
|-id=579 bgcolor=#E9E9E9
| 609579 ||  || — || April 10, 2005 || Kitt Peak || Spacewatch ||  || align=right | 2.2 km || 
|-id=580 bgcolor=#fefefe
| 609580 ||  || — || August 18, 2002 || Palomar || NEAT ||  || align=right | 1.0 km || 
|-id=581 bgcolor=#E9E9E9
| 609581 ||  || — || April 12, 2005 || Anderson Mesa || LONEOS ||  || align=right | 1.4 km || 
|-id=582 bgcolor=#E9E9E9
| 609582 ||  || — || April 12, 2005 || Kitt Peak || Spacewatch ||  || align=right | 2.5 km || 
|-id=583 bgcolor=#E9E9E9
| 609583 ||  || — || April 12, 2005 || Kitt Peak || Spacewatch ||  || align=right | 2.1 km || 
|-id=584 bgcolor=#E9E9E9
| 609584 ||  || — || April 12, 2005 || Mount Lemmon || Mount Lemmon Survey ||  || align=right | 1.9 km || 
|-id=585 bgcolor=#E9E9E9
| 609585 ||  || — || April 5, 2005 || Mount Lemmon || Mount Lemmon Survey ||  || align=right | 1.7 km || 
|-id=586 bgcolor=#fefefe
| 609586 ||  || — || April 1, 2005 || Kitt Peak || Spacewatch ||  || align=right data-sort-value="0.54" | 540 m || 
|-id=587 bgcolor=#fefefe
| 609587 ||  || — || April 12, 2005 || Kitt Peak || Spacewatch ||  || align=right data-sort-value="0.63" | 630 m || 
|-id=588 bgcolor=#E9E9E9
| 609588 ||  || — || March 4, 2005 || Mount Lemmon || Mount Lemmon Survey ||  || align=right | 1.2 km || 
|-id=589 bgcolor=#fefefe
| 609589 ||  || — || March 8, 2005 || Mount Lemmon || Mount Lemmon Survey ||  || align=right data-sort-value="0.51" | 510 m || 
|-id=590 bgcolor=#fefefe
| 609590 ||  || — || March 16, 2005 || Mount Lemmon || Mount Lemmon Survey ||  || align=right data-sort-value="0.57" | 570 m || 
|-id=591 bgcolor=#E9E9E9
| 609591 ||  || — || March 8, 2005 || Mount Lemmon || Mount Lemmon Survey ||  || align=right | 1.4 km || 
|-id=592 bgcolor=#fefefe
| 609592 ||  || — || April 10, 2005 || Kitt Peak || Kitt Peak Obs. ||  || align=right data-sort-value="0.66" | 660 m || 
|-id=593 bgcolor=#E9E9E9
| 609593 ||  || — || April 10, 2005 || Kitt Peak || Kitt Peak Obs. ||  || align=right | 1.6 km || 
|-id=594 bgcolor=#E9E9E9
| 609594 ||  || — || April 10, 2005 || Kitt Peak || Kitt Peak Obs. ||  || align=right | 1.5 km || 
|-id=595 bgcolor=#E9E9E9
| 609595 ||  || — || March 16, 2005 || Kitt Peak || Spacewatch ||  || align=right | 1.8 km || 
|-id=596 bgcolor=#E9E9E9
| 609596 ||  || — || April 4, 2005 || Mount Lemmon || Mount Lemmon Survey ||  || align=right | 1.6 km || 
|-id=597 bgcolor=#E9E9E9
| 609597 ||  || — || April 4, 2005 || Mount Lemmon || Mount Lemmon Survey ||  || align=right | 1.6 km || 
|-id=598 bgcolor=#fefefe
| 609598 ||  || — || April 6, 2005 || Mount Lemmon || Mount Lemmon Survey ||  || align=right data-sort-value="0.49" | 490 m || 
|-id=599 bgcolor=#fefefe
| 609599 ||  || — || April 2, 2005 || Kitt Peak || Spacewatch ||  || align=right data-sort-value="0.85" | 850 m || 
|-id=600 bgcolor=#E9E9E9
| 609600 ||  || — || January 1, 2009 || Kitt Peak || Spacewatch ||  || align=right | 1.3 km || 
|}

609601–609700 

|-bgcolor=#fefefe
| 609601 ||  || — || April 5, 2005 || Mount Lemmon || Mount Lemmon Survey ||  || align=right data-sort-value="0.60" | 600 m || 
|-id=602 bgcolor=#fefefe
| 609602 ||  || — || April 1, 2005 || Anderson Mesa || LONEOS ||  || align=right data-sort-value="0.76" | 760 m || 
|-id=603 bgcolor=#E9E9E9
| 609603 ||  || — || January 28, 2014 || Mayhill-ISON || L. Elenin ||  || align=right | 2.0 km || 
|-id=604 bgcolor=#fefefe
| 609604 ||  || — || April 6, 2005 || Kitt Peak || Spacewatch ||  || align=right data-sort-value="0.67" | 670 m || 
|-id=605 bgcolor=#E9E9E9
| 609605 ||  || — || January 17, 2009 || Kitt Peak || Spacewatch ||  || align=right | 1.2 km || 
|-id=606 bgcolor=#d6d6d6
| 609606 ||  || — || October 20, 2008 || Mount Lemmon || Mount Lemmon Survey ||  || align=right | 2.5 km || 
|-id=607 bgcolor=#E9E9E9
| 609607 ||  || — || September 25, 2011 || Haleakala || Pan-STARRS ||  || align=right | 2.0 km || 
|-id=608 bgcolor=#fefefe
| 609608 ||  || — || February 25, 2012 || Kitt Peak || Spacewatch ||  || align=right data-sort-value="0.64" | 640 m || 
|-id=609 bgcolor=#E9E9E9
| 609609 ||  || — || February 4, 2009 || Mount Lemmon || Mount Lemmon Survey ||  || align=right | 1.9 km || 
|-id=610 bgcolor=#fefefe
| 609610 ||  || — || October 29, 2010 || Mauna Kea || T. George, M. Micheli ||  || align=right data-sort-value="0.64" | 640 m || 
|-id=611 bgcolor=#fefefe
| 609611 ||  || — || March 11, 2005 || Mount Lemmon || Mount Lemmon Survey ||  || align=right data-sort-value="0.65" | 650 m || 
|-id=612 bgcolor=#d6d6d6
| 609612 ||  || — || November 20, 2008 || Kitt Peak || Spacewatch || 7:4 || align=right | 2.9 km || 
|-id=613 bgcolor=#fefefe
| 609613 ||  || — || April 6, 2005 || Kitt Peak || Spacewatch ||  || align=right data-sort-value="0.76" | 760 m || 
|-id=614 bgcolor=#E9E9E9
| 609614 ||  || — || April 2, 2014 || Mount Lemmon || Mount Lemmon Survey ||  || align=right | 1.3 km || 
|-id=615 bgcolor=#fefefe
| 609615 ||  || — || March 15, 2016 || Haleakala || Pan-STARRS ||  || align=right data-sort-value="0.68" | 680 m || 
|-id=616 bgcolor=#E9E9E9
| 609616 ||  || — || October 10, 2016 || Mount Lemmon || Mount Lemmon Survey ||  || align=right | 1.3 km || 
|-id=617 bgcolor=#E9E9E9
| 609617 ||  || — || September 30, 2011 || Kitt Peak || Spacewatch ||  || align=right | 1.8 km || 
|-id=618 bgcolor=#E9E9E9
| 609618 ||  || — || April 2, 2005 || Kitt Peak || Spacewatch ||  || align=right | 2.2 km || 
|-id=619 bgcolor=#fefefe
| 609619 ||  || — || April 1, 2005 || Kitt Peak || Spacewatch ||  || align=right data-sort-value="0.60" | 600 m || 
|-id=620 bgcolor=#fefefe
| 609620 ||  || — || November 28, 2014 || Haleakala || Pan-STARRS ||  || align=right data-sort-value="0.65" | 650 m || 
|-id=621 bgcolor=#fefefe
| 609621 ||  || — || March 10, 2005 || Mount Lemmon || Mount Lemmon Survey ||  || align=right data-sort-value="0.62" | 620 m || 
|-id=622 bgcolor=#E9E9E9
| 609622 ||  || — || December 31, 2008 || Kitt Peak || Spacewatch ||  || align=right | 1.4 km || 
|-id=623 bgcolor=#E9E9E9
| 609623 ||  || — || August 30, 2011 || Haleakala || Pan-STARRS ||  || align=right | 1.9 km || 
|-id=624 bgcolor=#E9E9E9
| 609624 ||  || — || April 2, 2005 || Catalina || CSS ||  || align=right | 1.5 km || 
|-id=625 bgcolor=#E9E9E9
| 609625 ||  || — || April 4, 2005 || Mount Lemmon || Mount Lemmon Survey ||  || align=right | 1.6 km || 
|-id=626 bgcolor=#E9E9E9
| 609626 ||  || — || October 21, 2012 || Haleakala || Pan-STARRS ||  || align=right | 1.5 km || 
|-id=627 bgcolor=#E9E9E9
| 609627 ||  || — || April 16, 2005 || Kitt Peak || Spacewatch ||  || align=right | 1.8 km || 
|-id=628 bgcolor=#E9E9E9
| 609628 ||  || — || April 17, 2005 || Kitt Peak || Spacewatch ||  || align=right | 1.8 km || 
|-id=629 bgcolor=#fefefe
| 609629 ||  || — || April 17, 2005 || Kitt Peak || Spacewatch ||  || align=right data-sort-value="0.63" | 630 m || 
|-id=630 bgcolor=#E9E9E9
| 609630 ||  || — || January 12, 2018 || Haleakala || Pan-STARRS ||  || align=right | 1.3 km || 
|-id=631 bgcolor=#fefefe
| 609631 ||  || — || November 2, 2010 || Mount Lemmon || Mount Lemmon Survey ||  || align=right data-sort-value="0.58" | 580 m || 
|-id=632 bgcolor=#E9E9E9
| 609632 ||  || — || October 7, 2016 || Mount Lemmon || Mount Lemmon Survey ||  || align=right | 1.8 km || 
|-id=633 bgcolor=#E9E9E9
| 609633 ||  || — || May 4, 2005 || Mauna Kea || Mauna Kea Obs. ||  || align=right | 1.7 km || 
|-id=634 bgcolor=#E9E9E9
| 609634 ||  || — || April 17, 2005 || Kitt Peak || Spacewatch ||  || align=right | 1.6 km || 
|-id=635 bgcolor=#fefefe
| 609635 ||  || — || April 11, 2005 || Mount Lemmon || Mount Lemmon Survey ||  || align=right data-sort-value="0.59" | 590 m || 
|-id=636 bgcolor=#fefefe
| 609636 ||  || — || May 4, 2005 || Mauna Kea || Mauna Kea Obs. ||  || align=right data-sort-value="0.64" | 640 m || 
|-id=637 bgcolor=#E9E9E9
| 609637 ||  || — || May 4, 2005 || Mount Lemmon || Mount Lemmon Survey ||  || align=right | 2.1 km || 
|-id=638 bgcolor=#E9E9E9
| 609638 ||  || — || April 11, 2005 || Mount Lemmon || Mount Lemmon Survey ||  || align=right | 2.0 km || 
|-id=639 bgcolor=#fefefe
| 609639 ||  || — || May 3, 2005 || Kitt Peak || Spacewatch ||  || align=right data-sort-value="0.62" | 620 m || 
|-id=640 bgcolor=#fefefe
| 609640 ||  || — || May 3, 2005 || Kitt Peak || Spacewatch || H || align=right data-sort-value="0.54" | 540 m || 
|-id=641 bgcolor=#E9E9E9
| 609641 ||  || — || May 4, 2005 || Kitt Peak || Spacewatch ||  || align=right | 2.2 km || 
|-id=642 bgcolor=#E9E9E9
| 609642 ||  || — || May 8, 2005 || Mount Lemmon || Mount Lemmon Survey ||  || align=right | 1.9 km || 
|-id=643 bgcolor=#E9E9E9
| 609643 ||  || — || April 4, 2005 || Catalina || CSS ||  || align=right | 1.8 km || 
|-id=644 bgcolor=#E9E9E9
| 609644 ||  || — || May 8, 2005 || Kitt Peak || Spacewatch ||  || align=right | 1.6 km || 
|-id=645 bgcolor=#E9E9E9
| 609645 ||  || — || May 9, 2005 || Mount Lemmon || Mount Lemmon Survey ||  || align=right | 1.3 km || 
|-id=646 bgcolor=#E9E9E9
| 609646 ||  || — || May 8, 2005 || Kitt Peak || Spacewatch ||  || align=right | 1.7 km || 
|-id=647 bgcolor=#fefefe
| 609647 ||  || — || May 9, 2005 || Mount Lemmon || Mount Lemmon Survey ||  || align=right data-sort-value="0.71" | 710 m || 
|-id=648 bgcolor=#E9E9E9
| 609648 ||  || — || May 10, 2005 || Mount Lemmon || Mount Lemmon Survey ||  || align=right | 1.8 km || 
|-id=649 bgcolor=#E9E9E9
| 609649 ||  || — || March 1, 2009 || Kitt Peak || Spacewatch ||  || align=right | 1.9 km || 
|-id=650 bgcolor=#fefefe
| 609650 ||  || — || May 11, 2005 || Mount Lemmon || Mount Lemmon Survey ||  || align=right data-sort-value="0.81" | 810 m || 
|-id=651 bgcolor=#fefefe
| 609651 ||  || — || May 13, 2005 || Kitt Peak || Spacewatch ||  || align=right data-sort-value="0.70" | 700 m || 
|-id=652 bgcolor=#E9E9E9
| 609652 ||  || — || May 13, 2005 || Kitt Peak || Spacewatch ||  || align=right | 2.0 km || 
|-id=653 bgcolor=#fefefe
| 609653 ||  || — || May 4, 2005 || Kitt Peak || Spacewatch ||  || align=right data-sort-value="0.65" | 650 m || 
|-id=654 bgcolor=#fefefe
| 609654 ||  || — || April 10, 2005 || Mount Lemmon || Mount Lemmon Survey ||  || align=right data-sort-value="0.57" | 570 m || 
|-id=655 bgcolor=#E9E9E9
| 609655 ||  || — || April 9, 2005 || Mount Lemmon || Mount Lemmon Survey ||  || align=right | 1.1 km || 
|-id=656 bgcolor=#fefefe
| 609656 ||  || — || May 8, 2005 || Mount Lemmon || Mount Lemmon Survey ||  || align=right data-sort-value="0.84" | 840 m || 
|-id=657 bgcolor=#fefefe
| 609657 ||  || — || March 15, 2012 || Mount Lemmon || Mount Lemmon Survey ||  || align=right data-sort-value="0.79" | 790 m || 
|-id=658 bgcolor=#fefefe
| 609658 ||  || — || October 29, 2010 || Mount Lemmon || Mount Lemmon Survey ||  || align=right data-sort-value="0.85" | 850 m || 
|-id=659 bgcolor=#fefefe
| 609659 ||  || — || May 10, 2005 || Mount Lemmon || Mount Lemmon Survey ||  || align=right data-sort-value="0.72" | 720 m || 
|-id=660 bgcolor=#E9E9E9
| 609660 ||  || — || May 18, 2014 || Mount Lemmon || Mount Lemmon Survey ||  || align=right | 1.9 km || 
|-id=661 bgcolor=#fefefe
| 609661 ||  || — || March 8, 2016 || Haleakala || Pan-STARRS ||  || align=right data-sort-value="0.77" | 770 m || 
|-id=662 bgcolor=#fefefe
| 609662 ||  || — || August 27, 2013 || Haleakala || Pan-STARRS ||  || align=right data-sort-value="0.71" | 710 m || 
|-id=663 bgcolor=#E9E9E9
| 609663 ||  || — || September 24, 2011 || Haleakala || Pan-STARRS ||  || align=right | 1.4 km || 
|-id=664 bgcolor=#fefefe
| 609664 ||  || — || January 11, 2008 || Kitt Peak || Spacewatch ||  || align=right data-sort-value="0.66" | 660 m || 
|-id=665 bgcolor=#E9E9E9
| 609665 ||  || — || May 11, 2005 || Mount Lemmon || Mount Lemmon Survey ||  || align=right | 1.7 km || 
|-id=666 bgcolor=#fefefe
| 609666 ||  || — || February 9, 2008 || Mount Lemmon || Mount Lemmon Survey ||  || align=right data-sort-value="0.57" | 570 m || 
|-id=667 bgcolor=#E9E9E9
| 609667 ||  || — || October 17, 2007 || Mount Lemmon || Mount Lemmon Survey ||  || align=right | 1.7 km || 
|-id=668 bgcolor=#d6d6d6
| 609668 ||  || — || November 26, 2014 || Haleakala || Pan-STARRS || 7:4 || align=right | 2.9 km || 
|-id=669 bgcolor=#fefefe
| 609669 ||  || — || May 15, 2005 || Mount Lemmon || Mount Lemmon Survey ||  || align=right data-sort-value="0.59" | 590 m || 
|-id=670 bgcolor=#E9E9E9
| 609670 ||  || — || May 17, 2005 || Mount Lemmon || Mount Lemmon Survey ||  || align=right | 1.4 km || 
|-id=671 bgcolor=#E9E9E9
| 609671 ||  || — || February 20, 2009 || Kitt Peak || Spacewatch ||  || align=right | 1.7 km || 
|-id=672 bgcolor=#fefefe
| 609672 ||  || — || May 15, 2005 || Mount Lemmon || Mount Lemmon Survey ||  || align=right data-sort-value="0.64" | 640 m || 
|-id=673 bgcolor=#E9E9E9
| 609673 ||  || — || September 4, 2011 || Haleakala || Pan-STARRS ||  || align=right | 1.6 km || 
|-id=674 bgcolor=#d6d6d6
| 609674 ||  || — || June 2, 2005 || Catalina || CSS ||  || align=right | 1.5 km || 
|-id=675 bgcolor=#E9E9E9
| 609675 ||  || — || June 3, 2005 || Kitt Peak || Spacewatch ||  || align=right | 2.3 km || 
|-id=676 bgcolor=#fefefe
| 609676 ||  || — || June 8, 2005 || Kitt Peak || Spacewatch ||  || align=right data-sort-value="0.72" | 720 m || 
|-id=677 bgcolor=#E9E9E9
| 609677 ||  || — || June 8, 2005 || Kitt Peak || Spacewatch ||  || align=right | 2.0 km || 
|-id=678 bgcolor=#E9E9E9
| 609678 ||  || — || May 10, 2005 || Mount Lemmon || Mount Lemmon Survey ||  || align=right | 1.8 km || 
|-id=679 bgcolor=#fefefe
| 609679 ||  || — || June 3, 2005 || Catalina || CSS ||  || align=right data-sort-value="0.76" | 760 m || 
|-id=680 bgcolor=#fefefe
| 609680 ||  || — || April 30, 2005 || Kitt Peak || Spacewatch ||  || align=right data-sort-value="0.69" | 690 m || 
|-id=681 bgcolor=#E9E9E9
| 609681 ||  || — || June 11, 2005 || Kitt Peak || Spacewatch ||  || align=right | 2.6 km || 
|-id=682 bgcolor=#E9E9E9
| 609682 ||  || — || June 11, 2005 || Kitt Peak || Spacewatch ||  || align=right | 2.4 km || 
|-id=683 bgcolor=#E9E9E9
| 609683 ||  || — || June 3, 2005 || Kitt Peak || Spacewatch ||  || align=right | 2.3 km || 
|-id=684 bgcolor=#fefefe
| 609684 ||  || — || October 21, 2006 || Mount Lemmon || Mount Lemmon Survey ||  || align=right data-sort-value="0.77" | 770 m || 
|-id=685 bgcolor=#fefefe
| 609685 ||  || — || March 16, 2012 || Mount Lemmon || Mount Lemmon Survey ||  || align=right data-sort-value="0.69" | 690 m || 
|-id=686 bgcolor=#fefefe
| 609686 ||  || — || June 11, 2005 || Kitt Peak || Spacewatch ||  || align=right data-sort-value="0.77" | 770 m || 
|-id=687 bgcolor=#fefefe
| 609687 ||  || — || November 11, 2006 || Kitt Peak || Spacewatch ||  || align=right data-sort-value="0.48" | 480 m || 
|-id=688 bgcolor=#E9E9E9
| 609688 ||  || — || January 22, 2013 || Catalina || CSS ||  || align=right | 2.0 km || 
|-id=689 bgcolor=#fefefe
| 609689 ||  || — || April 18, 2012 || Mount Lemmon || Mount Lemmon Survey ||  || align=right data-sort-value="0.88" | 880 m || 
|-id=690 bgcolor=#fefefe
| 609690 ||  || — || February 22, 2012 || Catalina || CSS ||  || align=right data-sort-value="0.79" | 790 m || 
|-id=691 bgcolor=#fefefe
| 609691 ||  || — || February 12, 2008 || Mount Lemmon || Mount Lemmon Survey ||  || align=right data-sort-value="0.73" | 730 m || 
|-id=692 bgcolor=#fefefe
| 609692 ||  || — || June 13, 2005 || Mount Lemmon || Mount Lemmon Survey ||  || align=right data-sort-value="0.84" | 840 m || 
|-id=693 bgcolor=#fefefe
| 609693 ||  || — || June 13, 2005 || Mount Lemmon || Mount Lemmon Survey ||  || align=right data-sort-value="0.60" | 600 m || 
|-id=694 bgcolor=#fefefe
| 609694 ||  || — || June 3, 2005 || Kitt Peak || Spacewatch ||  || align=right data-sort-value="0.62" | 620 m || 
|-id=695 bgcolor=#fefefe
| 609695 ||  || — || June 24, 2005 || Palomar || NEAT ||  || align=right data-sort-value="0.88" | 880 m || 
|-id=696 bgcolor=#fefefe
| 609696 ||  || — || June 27, 2005 || Mount Lemmon || Mount Lemmon Survey ||  || align=right data-sort-value="0.80" | 800 m || 
|-id=697 bgcolor=#fefefe
| 609697 ||  || — || June 29, 2005 || Palomar || NEAT ||  || align=right data-sort-value="0.88" | 880 m || 
|-id=698 bgcolor=#d6d6d6
| 609698 ||  || — || May 19, 2005 || Mount Lemmon || Mount Lemmon Survey ||  || align=right | 1.7 km || 
|-id=699 bgcolor=#E9E9E9
| 609699 ||  || — || June 29, 2005 || Kitt Peak || Spacewatch ||  || align=right | 2.4 km || 
|-id=700 bgcolor=#E9E9E9
| 609700 ||  || — || June 30, 2005 || Palomar || NEAT ||  || align=right | 2.9 km || 
|}

609701–609800 

|-bgcolor=#fefefe
| 609701 ||  || — || June 30, 2005 || Kitt Peak || Spacewatch ||  || align=right data-sort-value="0.58" | 580 m || 
|-id=702 bgcolor=#fefefe
| 609702 ||  || — || June 29, 2005 || Kitt Peak || Spacewatch ||  || align=right data-sort-value="0.91" | 910 m || 
|-id=703 bgcolor=#fefefe
| 609703 ||  || — || June 30, 2005 || Kitt Peak || Spacewatch ||  || align=right data-sort-value="0.80" | 800 m || 
|-id=704 bgcolor=#d6d6d6
| 609704 ||  || — || June 30, 2005 || Kitt Peak || Spacewatch ||  || align=right | 2.2 km || 
|-id=705 bgcolor=#d6d6d6
| 609705 ||  || — || March 16, 2004 || Kitt Peak || Spacewatch ||  || align=right | 2.5 km || 
|-id=706 bgcolor=#d6d6d6
| 609706 ||  || — || July 4, 2005 || Kitt Peak || Spacewatch ||  || align=right | 2.1 km || 
|-id=707 bgcolor=#fefefe
| 609707 ||  || — || July 5, 2005 || Kitt Peak || Spacewatch ||  || align=right data-sort-value="0.58" | 580 m || 
|-id=708 bgcolor=#fefefe
| 609708 ||  || — || July 1, 2005 || Kitt Peak || Spacewatch ||  || align=right data-sort-value="0.83" | 830 m || 
|-id=709 bgcolor=#d6d6d6
| 609709 ||  || — || July 5, 2005 || Kitt Peak || Spacewatch ||  || align=right | 1.6 km || 
|-id=710 bgcolor=#fefefe
| 609710 ||  || — || July 7, 2005 || Kitt Peak || Spacewatch ||  || align=right data-sort-value="0.58" | 580 m || 
|-id=711 bgcolor=#fefefe
| 609711 ||  || — || July 10, 2005 || Kitt Peak || Spacewatch ||  || align=right data-sort-value="0.66" | 660 m || 
|-id=712 bgcolor=#fefefe
| 609712 ||  || — || July 6, 2005 || Siding Spring || SSS ||  || align=right data-sort-value="0.92" | 920 m || 
|-id=713 bgcolor=#d6d6d6
| 609713 ||  || — || July 5, 2005 || Kitt Peak || Spacewatch ||  || align=right | 1.8 km || 
|-id=714 bgcolor=#fefefe
| 609714 ||  || — || March 11, 2008 || Kitt Peak || Spacewatch ||  || align=right data-sort-value="0.65" | 650 m || 
|-id=715 bgcolor=#d6d6d6
| 609715 ||  || — || July 5, 2005 || Mount Lemmon || Mount Lemmon Survey ||  || align=right | 2.1 km || 
|-id=716 bgcolor=#E9E9E9
| 609716 ||  || — || July 5, 2005 || Mount Lemmon || Mount Lemmon Survey ||  || align=right | 2.3 km || 
|-id=717 bgcolor=#d6d6d6
| 609717 ||  || — || July 5, 2005 || Mount Lemmon || Mount Lemmon Survey ||  || align=right | 2.3 km || 
|-id=718 bgcolor=#d6d6d6
| 609718 ||  || — || July 7, 2005 || Mauna Kea || Mauna Kea Obs. ||  || align=right | 1.7 km || 
|-id=719 bgcolor=#fefefe
| 609719 ||  || — || July 15, 2005 || Mount Lemmon || Mount Lemmon Survey || MAS || align=right data-sort-value="0.69" | 690 m || 
|-id=720 bgcolor=#d6d6d6
| 609720 ||  || — || July 15, 2005 || Mount Lemmon || Mount Lemmon Survey ||  || align=right | 2.3 km || 
|-id=721 bgcolor=#E9E9E9
| 609721 ||  || — || July 7, 2005 || Mauna Kea || Mauna Kea Obs. ||  || align=right | 1.6 km || 
|-id=722 bgcolor=#fefefe
| 609722 ||  || — || July 7, 2005 || Mauna Kea || Mauna Kea Obs. ||  || align=right data-sort-value="0.59" | 590 m || 
|-id=723 bgcolor=#fefefe
| 609723 ||  || — || January 29, 2011 || Mount Lemmon || Mount Lemmon Survey ||  || align=right data-sort-value="0.86" | 860 m || 
|-id=724 bgcolor=#E9E9E9
| 609724 ||  || — || December 30, 2007 || Kitt Peak || Spacewatch ||  || align=right | 2.4 km || 
|-id=725 bgcolor=#fefefe
| 609725 ||  || — || July 4, 2005 || Mount Lemmon || Mount Lemmon Survey ||  || align=right data-sort-value="0.75" | 750 m || 
|-id=726 bgcolor=#fefefe
| 609726 ||  || — || July 5, 2005 || Mount Lemmon || Mount Lemmon Survey ||  || align=right data-sort-value="0.86" | 860 m || 
|-id=727 bgcolor=#d6d6d6
| 609727 ||  || — || February 10, 2008 || Kitt Peak || Spacewatch ||  || align=right | 2.1 km || 
|-id=728 bgcolor=#d6d6d6
| 609728 ||  || — || June 29, 2015 || Haleakala || Pan-STARRS ||  || align=right | 2.1 km || 
|-id=729 bgcolor=#d6d6d6
| 609729 ||  || — || March 31, 2009 || Kitt Peak || Spacewatch ||  || align=right | 1.9 km || 
|-id=730 bgcolor=#fefefe
| 609730 ||  || — || February 26, 2008 || Mount Lemmon || Mount Lemmon Survey ||  || align=right data-sort-value="0.80" | 800 m || 
|-id=731 bgcolor=#fefefe
| 609731 ||  || — || July 15, 2005 || Kitt Peak || Spacewatch ||  || align=right data-sort-value="0.73" | 730 m || 
|-id=732 bgcolor=#fefefe
| 609732 ||  || — || June 14, 2005 || Mount Lemmon || Mount Lemmon Survey ||  || align=right data-sort-value="0.75" | 750 m || 
|-id=733 bgcolor=#fefefe
| 609733 ||  || — || July 15, 2005 || Mount Lemmon || Mount Lemmon Survey ||  || align=right data-sort-value="0.56" | 560 m || 
|-id=734 bgcolor=#d6d6d6
| 609734 ||  || — || October 21, 2006 || Kitt Peak || Spacewatch ||  || align=right | 1.9 km || 
|-id=735 bgcolor=#E9E9E9
| 609735 ||  || — || January 11, 2008 || Kitt Peak || Spacewatch ||  || align=right | 1.7 km || 
|-id=736 bgcolor=#E9E9E9
| 609736 ||  || — || July 5, 2005 || Mount Lemmon || Mount Lemmon Survey ||  || align=right | 2.1 km || 
|-id=737 bgcolor=#d6d6d6
| 609737 ||  || — || September 25, 2006 || Mount Lemmon || Mount Lemmon Survey ||  || align=right | 1.8 km || 
|-id=738 bgcolor=#E9E9E9
| 609738 ||  || — || September 12, 2015 || Haleakala || Pan-STARRS ||  || align=right | 1.8 km || 
|-id=739 bgcolor=#d6d6d6
| 609739 ||  || — || October 24, 2011 || Kitt Peak || Spacewatch ||  || align=right | 2.1 km || 
|-id=740 bgcolor=#fefefe
| 609740 ||  || — || July 8, 2005 || Kitt Peak || Spacewatch ||  || align=right data-sort-value="0.73" | 730 m || 
|-id=741 bgcolor=#d6d6d6
| 609741 ||  || — || July 5, 2005 || Mount Lemmon || Mount Lemmon Survey ||  || align=right | 2.0 km || 
|-id=742 bgcolor=#d6d6d6
| 609742 ||  || — || July 3, 2005 || Mount Lemmon || Mount Lemmon Survey ||  || align=right | 1.9 km || 
|-id=743 bgcolor=#fefefe
| 609743 ||  || — || July 4, 2005 || Mount Lemmon || Mount Lemmon Survey ||  || align=right data-sort-value="0.82" | 820 m || 
|-id=744 bgcolor=#E9E9E9
| 609744 ||  || — || July 30, 2005 || Palomar || NEAT ||  || align=right | 2.5 km || 
|-id=745 bgcolor=#E9E9E9
| 609745 ||  || — || February 2, 2012 || Kitt Peak || Spacewatch ||  || align=right | 1.8 km || 
|-id=746 bgcolor=#fefefe
| 609746 ||  || — || July 28, 2005 || Palomar || NEAT ||  || align=right data-sort-value="0.86" | 860 m || 
|-id=747 bgcolor=#E9E9E9
| 609747 ||  || — || June 21, 2014 || Haleakala || Pan-STARRS ||  || align=right | 2.7 km || 
|-id=748 bgcolor=#fefefe
| 609748 ||  || — || November 1, 2013 || Kitt Peak || Spacewatch ||  || align=right data-sort-value="0.82" | 820 m || 
|-id=749 bgcolor=#fefefe
| 609749 ||  || — || December 24, 2006 || Kitt Peak || Spacewatch ||  || align=right data-sort-value="0.87" | 870 m || 
|-id=750 bgcolor=#d6d6d6
| 609750 ||  || — || August 4, 2005 || Palomar || NEAT ||  || align=right | 2.0 km || 
|-id=751 bgcolor=#E9E9E9
| 609751 ||  || — || August 6, 2005 || Siding Spring || SSS ||  || align=right | 2.9 km || 
|-id=752 bgcolor=#fefefe
| 609752 ||  || — || February 24, 2012 || Mount Lemmon || Mount Lemmon Survey ||  || align=right data-sort-value="0.83" | 830 m || 
|-id=753 bgcolor=#fefefe
| 609753 ||  || — || July 12, 2005 || Mount Lemmon || Mount Lemmon Survey ||  || align=right data-sort-value="0.59" | 590 m || 
|-id=754 bgcolor=#d6d6d6
| 609754 ||  || — || August 9, 2005 || Cerro Tololo || Cerro Tololo Obs. ||  || align=right | 1.6 km || 
|-id=755 bgcolor=#d6d6d6
| 609755 ||  || — || August 27, 2005 || Saint-Sulpice || B. Christophe ||  || align=right | 2.3 km || 
|-id=756 bgcolor=#fefefe
| 609756 ||  || — || August 25, 2005 || Palomar || NEAT || H || align=right data-sort-value="0.53" | 530 m || 
|-id=757 bgcolor=#fefefe
| 609757 ||  || — || August 25, 2005 || Palomar || NEAT ||  || align=right data-sort-value="0.88" | 880 m || 
|-id=758 bgcolor=#d6d6d6
| 609758 ||  || — || August 25, 2005 || Campo Imperatore || A. Boattini ||  || align=right | 1.8 km || 
|-id=759 bgcolor=#d6d6d6
| 609759 ||  || — || August 27, 2005 || Kitt Peak || Spacewatch ||  || align=right | 1.7 km || 
|-id=760 bgcolor=#fefefe
| 609760 ||  || — || August 28, 2005 || St. Veran || Saint-Véran Obs. ||  || align=right data-sort-value="0.64" | 640 m || 
|-id=761 bgcolor=#d6d6d6
| 609761 ||  || — || August 25, 2005 || Palomar || NEAT ||  || align=right | 2.1 km || 
|-id=762 bgcolor=#d6d6d6
| 609762 ||  || — || August 28, 2005 || Kitt Peak || Spacewatch ||  || align=right | 1.8 km || 
|-id=763 bgcolor=#fefefe
| 609763 ||  || — || August 30, 2005 || Kitt Peak || Spacewatch ||  || align=right data-sort-value="0.85" | 850 m || 
|-id=764 bgcolor=#d6d6d6
| 609764 ||  || — || August 31, 2005 || Kitt Peak || Spacewatch ||  || align=right | 2.2 km || 
|-id=765 bgcolor=#d6d6d6
| 609765 ||  || — || August 28, 2005 || Kitt Peak || Spacewatch ||  || align=right | 2.2 km || 
|-id=766 bgcolor=#d6d6d6
| 609766 ||  || — || August 28, 2005 || Kitt Peak || Spacewatch ||  || align=right | 1.8 km || 
|-id=767 bgcolor=#d6d6d6
| 609767 ||  || — || August 28, 2005 || Kitt Peak || Spacewatch ||  || align=right | 2.2 km || 
|-id=768 bgcolor=#d6d6d6
| 609768 ||  || — || August 28, 2005 || Kitt Peak || Spacewatch ||  || align=right | 2.5 km || 
|-id=769 bgcolor=#fefefe
| 609769 ||  || — || August 26, 2005 || Palomar || NEAT ||  || align=right data-sort-value="0.85" | 850 m || 
|-id=770 bgcolor=#d6d6d6
| 609770 ||  || — || August 27, 2005 || Palomar || NEAT ||  || align=right | 2.1 km || 
|-id=771 bgcolor=#fefefe
| 609771 ||  || — || July 30, 2005 || Palomar || NEAT ||  || align=right | 1.1 km || 
|-id=772 bgcolor=#fefefe
| 609772 ||  || — || September 3, 2005 || Palomar || NEAT ||  || align=right data-sort-value="0.75" | 750 m || 
|-id=773 bgcolor=#fefefe
| 609773 ||  || — || August 31, 2005 || Anderson Mesa || LONEOS || H || align=right data-sort-value="0.70" | 700 m || 
|-id=774 bgcolor=#FA8072
| 609774 ||  || — || August 26, 2005 || Palomar || NEAT ||  || align=right data-sort-value="0.60" | 600 m || 
|-id=775 bgcolor=#fefefe
| 609775 ||  || — || August 28, 2005 || Kitt Peak || Spacewatch ||  || align=right data-sort-value="0.66" | 660 m || 
|-id=776 bgcolor=#fefefe
| 609776 ||  || — || February 16, 2015 || Haleakala || Pan-STARRS ||  || align=right data-sort-value="0.61" | 610 m || 
|-id=777 bgcolor=#d6d6d6
| 609777 ||  || — || March 1, 2008 || Mount Lemmon || Mount Lemmon Survey ||  || align=right | 2.2 km || 
|-id=778 bgcolor=#fefefe
| 609778 ||  || — || August 31, 2005 || Kitt Peak || Spacewatch ||  || align=right data-sort-value="0.62" | 620 m || 
|-id=779 bgcolor=#fefefe
| 609779 ||  || — || January 30, 2017 || Haleakala || Pan-STARRS || H || align=right data-sort-value="0.49" | 490 m || 
|-id=780 bgcolor=#d6d6d6
| 609780 ||  || — || August 27, 2005 || Kitt Peak || Spacewatch ||  || align=right | 1.9 km || 
|-id=781 bgcolor=#d6d6d6
| 609781 ||  || — || August 27, 2005 || Palomar || NEAT ||  || align=right | 2.3 km || 
|-id=782 bgcolor=#d6d6d6
| 609782 ||  || — || August 31, 2005 || Kitt Peak || Spacewatch ||  || align=right | 2.1 km || 
|-id=783 bgcolor=#fefefe
| 609783 ||  || — || August 30, 2005 || Kitt Peak || Spacewatch ||  || align=right data-sort-value="0.58" | 580 m || 
|-id=784 bgcolor=#d6d6d6
| 609784 ||  || — || September 1, 2005 || Kitt Peak || Spacewatch ||  || align=right | 2.0 km || 
|-id=785 bgcolor=#fefefe
| 609785 ||  || — || July 12, 2005 || Kitt Peak || Spacewatch ||  || align=right data-sort-value="0.71" | 710 m || 
|-id=786 bgcolor=#d6d6d6
| 609786 ||  || — || September 3, 2005 || Mauna Kea || Mauna Kea Obs. ||  || align=right | 1.7 km || 
|-id=787 bgcolor=#fefefe
| 609787 ||  || — || September 1, 2005 || Kitt Peak || Spacewatch ||  || align=right data-sort-value="0.71" | 710 m || 
|-id=788 bgcolor=#fefefe
| 609788 ||  || — || April 4, 2008 || Mount Lemmon || Mount Lemmon Survey ||  || align=right data-sort-value="0.78" | 780 m || 
|-id=789 bgcolor=#fefefe
| 609789 ||  || — || September 12, 2005 || Kitt Peak || Spacewatch ||  || align=right data-sort-value="0.80" | 800 m || 
|-id=790 bgcolor=#fefefe
| 609790 ||  || — || September 14, 2005 || Kitt Peak || Spacewatch ||  || align=right data-sort-value="0.60" | 600 m || 
|-id=791 bgcolor=#d6d6d6
| 609791 ||  || — || November 22, 2006 || Kitt Peak || Spacewatch ||  || align=right | 2.3 km || 
|-id=792 bgcolor=#d6d6d6
| 609792 ||  || — || September 13, 2005 || Kitt Peak || Spacewatch ||  || align=right | 1.9 km || 
|-id=793 bgcolor=#d6d6d6
| 609793 ||  || — || September 14, 2005 || Kitt Peak || Spacewatch ||  || align=right | 2.1 km || 
|-id=794 bgcolor=#fefefe
| 609794 ||  || — || September 1, 2005 || Kitt Peak || Spacewatch ||  || align=right data-sort-value="0.64" | 640 m || 
|-id=795 bgcolor=#fefefe
| 609795 ||  || — || September 13, 2005 || Kitt Peak || Spacewatch ||  || align=right data-sort-value="0.67" | 670 m || 
|-id=796 bgcolor=#d6d6d6
| 609796 ||  || — || September 13, 2005 || Kitt Peak || Spacewatch ||  || align=right | 1.9 km || 
|-id=797 bgcolor=#FA8072
| 609797 ||  || — || September 16, 2005 || Wrightwood || J. W. Young || H || align=right data-sort-value="0.66" | 660 m || 
|-id=798 bgcolor=#fefefe
| 609798 ||  || — || September 23, 2005 || Kitt Peak || Spacewatch ||  || align=right data-sort-value="0.82" | 820 m || 
|-id=799 bgcolor=#d6d6d6
| 609799 ||  || — || September 24, 2005 || Kitt Peak || Spacewatch ||  || align=right | 2.0 km || 
|-id=800 bgcolor=#fefefe
| 609800 ||  || — || September 26, 2005 || Kitt Peak || Spacewatch ||  || align=right data-sort-value="0.88" | 880 m || 
|}

609801–609900 

|-bgcolor=#d6d6d6
| 609801 ||  || — || September 24, 2005 || Kitt Peak || Spacewatch ||  || align=right | 1.7 km || 
|-id=802 bgcolor=#d6d6d6
| 609802 ||  || — || September 24, 2005 || Kitt Peak || Spacewatch ||  || align=right | 2.3 km || 
|-id=803 bgcolor=#fefefe
| 609803 ||  || — || September 25, 2005 || Kitt Peak || Spacewatch ||  || align=right data-sort-value="0.51" | 510 m || 
|-id=804 bgcolor=#d6d6d6
| 609804 ||  || — || September 29, 2005 || Mount Lemmon || Mount Lemmon Survey ||  || align=right | 2.0 km || 
|-id=805 bgcolor=#d6d6d6
| 609805 ||  || — || September 29, 2005 || Mount Lemmon || Mount Lemmon Survey ||  || align=right | 1.9 km || 
|-id=806 bgcolor=#fefefe
| 609806 ||  || — || September 29, 2005 || Mount Lemmon || Mount Lemmon Survey ||  || align=right data-sort-value="0.65" | 650 m || 
|-id=807 bgcolor=#d6d6d6
| 609807 ||  || — || September 24, 2005 || Kitt Peak || Spacewatch ||  || align=right | 1.7 km || 
|-id=808 bgcolor=#fefefe
| 609808 ||  || — || September 29, 2005 || Mount Lemmon || Mount Lemmon Survey ||  || align=right data-sort-value="0.56" | 560 m || 
|-id=809 bgcolor=#d6d6d6
| 609809 ||  || — || September 12, 2005 || Kitt Peak || Spacewatch ||  || align=right | 1.7 km || 
|-id=810 bgcolor=#d6d6d6
| 609810 ||  || — || September 13, 2005 || Kitt Peak || Spacewatch ||  || align=right | 1.9 km || 
|-id=811 bgcolor=#fefefe
| 609811 ||  || — || September 30, 2005 || Mount Lemmon || Mount Lemmon Survey ||  || align=right data-sort-value="0.57" | 570 m || 
|-id=812 bgcolor=#fefefe
| 609812 ||  || — || September 30, 2005 || Mount Lemmon || Mount Lemmon Survey ||  || align=right data-sort-value="0.89" | 890 m || 
|-id=813 bgcolor=#fefefe
| 609813 ||  || — || September 29, 2005 || Mount Lemmon || Mount Lemmon Survey ||  || align=right data-sort-value="0.48" | 480 m || 
|-id=814 bgcolor=#fefefe
| 609814 ||  || — || September 30, 2005 || Kitt Peak || Spacewatch ||  || align=right data-sort-value="0.53" | 530 m || 
|-id=815 bgcolor=#d6d6d6
| 609815 ||  || — || September 27, 2005 || Apache Point || SDSS Collaboration ||  || align=right | 2.1 km || 
|-id=816 bgcolor=#d6d6d6
| 609816 ||  || — || March 14, 2007 || Mount Lemmon || Mount Lemmon Survey ||  || align=right | 1.9 km || 
|-id=817 bgcolor=#d6d6d6
| 609817 ||  || — || October 25, 2005 || Apache Point || SDSS Collaboration ||  || align=right | 2.0 km || 
|-id=818 bgcolor=#E9E9E9
| 609818 ||  || — || September 30, 2005 || Mauna Kea || Mauna Kea Obs. ||  || align=right data-sort-value="0.71" | 710 m || 
|-id=819 bgcolor=#d6d6d6
| 609819 ||  || — || December 26, 2011 || Kitt Peak || Spacewatch ||  || align=right | 2.0 km || 
|-id=820 bgcolor=#d6d6d6
| 609820 ||  || — || February 22, 2012 || Charleston || R. Holmes ||  || align=right | 2.1 km || 
|-id=821 bgcolor=#d6d6d6
| 609821 ||  || — || October 12, 2016 || Haleakala || Pan-STARRS ||  || align=right | 1.7 km || 
|-id=822 bgcolor=#fefefe
| 609822 ||  || — || September 29, 2005 || Kitt Peak || Spacewatch ||  || align=right data-sort-value="0.53" | 530 m || 
|-id=823 bgcolor=#d6d6d6
| 609823 ||  || — || September 30, 2005 || Mauna Kea || Mauna Kea Obs. || 3:2 || align=right | 3.4 km || 
|-id=824 bgcolor=#d6d6d6
| 609824 ||  || — || September 30, 2005 || Mount Lemmon || Mount Lemmon Survey ||  || align=right | 1.6 km || 
|-id=825 bgcolor=#d6d6d6
| 609825 ||  || — || October 1, 2005 || Kitt Peak || Spacewatch ||  || align=right | 2.2 km || 
|-id=826 bgcolor=#d6d6d6
| 609826 ||  || — || October 1, 2005 || Kitt Peak || Spacewatch || KOR || align=right | 1.1 km || 
|-id=827 bgcolor=#fefefe
| 609827 ||  || — || August 29, 2005 || Palomar || NEAT ||  || align=right data-sort-value="0.98" | 980 m || 
|-id=828 bgcolor=#fefefe
| 609828 ||  || — || August 27, 2005 || Palomar || NEAT ||  || align=right data-sort-value="0.97" | 970 m || 
|-id=829 bgcolor=#d6d6d6
| 609829 ||  || — || October 1, 2005 || Kitt Peak || Spacewatch ||  || align=right | 1.9 km || 
|-id=830 bgcolor=#d6d6d6
| 609830 ||  || — || October 1, 2005 || Mount Lemmon || Mount Lemmon Survey ||  || align=right | 1.4 km || 
|-id=831 bgcolor=#d6d6d6
| 609831 ||  || — || October 2, 2005 || Mount Lemmon || Mount Lemmon Survey ||  || align=right | 1.9 km || 
|-id=832 bgcolor=#d6d6d6
| 609832 ||  || — || October 4, 2005 || Mount Lemmon || Mount Lemmon Survey ||  || align=right | 2.3 km || 
|-id=833 bgcolor=#d6d6d6
| 609833 ||  || — || October 3, 2005 || Kitt Peak || Spacewatch ||  || align=right | 2.0 km || 
|-id=834 bgcolor=#fefefe
| 609834 ||  || — || October 6, 2005 || Kitt Peak || Spacewatch ||  || align=right data-sort-value="0.63" | 630 m || 
|-id=835 bgcolor=#d6d6d6
| 609835 ||  || — || September 25, 2005 || Kitt Peak || Spacewatch ||  || align=right | 2.3 km || 
|-id=836 bgcolor=#d6d6d6
| 609836 ||  || — || October 7, 2005 || Kitt Peak || Spacewatch ||  || align=right | 1.6 km || 
|-id=837 bgcolor=#fefefe
| 609837 ||  || — || September 27, 2005 || Kitt Peak || Spacewatch ||  || align=right data-sort-value="0.41" | 410 m || 
|-id=838 bgcolor=#fefefe
| 609838 ||  || — || April 26, 2000 || Kitt Peak || Spacewatch ||  || align=right data-sort-value="0.93" | 930 m || 
|-id=839 bgcolor=#fefefe
| 609839 ||  || — || October 7, 2005 || Kitt Peak || Spacewatch ||  || align=right data-sort-value="0.71" | 710 m || 
|-id=840 bgcolor=#d6d6d6
| 609840 ||  || — || October 7, 2005 || Kitt Peak || Spacewatch ||  || align=right | 2.6 km || 
|-id=841 bgcolor=#fefefe
| 609841 ||  || — || October 8, 2005 || Kitt Peak || Spacewatch ||  || align=right data-sort-value="0.92" | 920 m || 
|-id=842 bgcolor=#d6d6d6
| 609842 ||  || — || September 29, 2005 || Kitt Peak || Spacewatch || KOR || align=right | 1.6 km || 
|-id=843 bgcolor=#d6d6d6
| 609843 ||  || — || October 8, 2005 || Kitt Peak || Spacewatch ||  || align=right | 2.0 km || 
|-id=844 bgcolor=#d6d6d6
| 609844 ||  || — || October 1, 2005 || Mount Lemmon || Mount Lemmon Survey ||  || align=right | 1.7 km || 
|-id=845 bgcolor=#d6d6d6
| 609845 ||  || — || October 3, 2005 || Kitt Peak || Spacewatch ||  || align=right | 2.3 km || 
|-id=846 bgcolor=#d6d6d6
| 609846 ||  || — || October 2, 2005 || Mount Lemmon || Mount Lemmon Survey || 3:2 || align=right | 3.7 km || 
|-id=847 bgcolor=#d6d6d6
| 609847 ||  || — || October 6, 2005 || Mount Lemmon || Mount Lemmon Survey || 3:2 || align=right | 3.2 km || 
|-id=848 bgcolor=#d6d6d6
| 609848 ||  || — || October 1, 2005 || Mount Lemmon || Mount Lemmon Survey ||  || align=right | 2.0 km || 
|-id=849 bgcolor=#d6d6d6
| 609849 ||  || — || October 4, 2005 || Mount Lemmon || Mount Lemmon Survey ||  || align=right | 2.2 km || 
|-id=850 bgcolor=#FA8072
| 609850 ||  || — || October 1, 2005 || Kitt Peak || Spacewatch ||  || align=right data-sort-value="0.63" | 630 m || 
|-id=851 bgcolor=#d6d6d6
| 609851 ||  || — || October 1, 2005 || Kitt Peak || Spacewatch ||  || align=right | 2.2 km || 
|-id=852 bgcolor=#d6d6d6
| 609852 ||  || — || September 20, 2015 || Mount Lemmon || Mount Lemmon Survey ||  || align=right | 2.3 km || 
|-id=853 bgcolor=#d6d6d6
| 609853 ||  || — || November 23, 2016 || Mount Lemmon || Mount Lemmon Survey ||  || align=right | 1.8 km || 
|-id=854 bgcolor=#fefefe
| 609854 ||  || — || March 11, 2007 || Anderson Mesa || LONEOS ||  || align=right data-sort-value="0.85" | 850 m || 
|-id=855 bgcolor=#fefefe
| 609855 ||  || — || October 11, 2005 || Kitt Peak || Spacewatch ||  || align=right data-sort-value="0.91" | 910 m || 
|-id=856 bgcolor=#d6d6d6
| 609856 ||  || — || September 18, 2015 || Mount Lemmon || Mount Lemmon Survey ||  || align=right | 2.0 km || 
|-id=857 bgcolor=#fefefe
| 609857 ||  || — || February 20, 2015 || Haleakala || Pan-STARRS ||  || align=right data-sort-value="0.72" | 720 m || 
|-id=858 bgcolor=#d6d6d6
| 609858 ||  || — || October 5, 2013 || Haleakala || Pan-STARRS || Tj (2.97) || align=right | 2.9 km || 
|-id=859 bgcolor=#fefefe
| 609859 ||  || — || February 23, 2011 || Kitt Peak || Spacewatch ||  || align=right data-sort-value="0.73" | 730 m || 
|-id=860 bgcolor=#d6d6d6
| 609860 ||  || — || March 7, 2013 || Mount Lemmon || Mount Lemmon Survey ||  || align=right | 2.1 km || 
|-id=861 bgcolor=#d6d6d6
| 609861 ||  || — || October 1, 2005 || Mount Lemmon || Mount Lemmon Survey || 3:2 || align=right | 3.2 km || 
|-id=862 bgcolor=#fefefe
| 609862 ||  || — || October 9, 2005 || Kitt Peak || Spacewatch ||  || align=right data-sort-value="0.90" | 900 m || 
|-id=863 bgcolor=#d6d6d6
| 609863 ||  || — || October 12, 2005 || Kitt Peak || Spacewatch ||  || align=right | 1.6 km || 
|-id=864 bgcolor=#d6d6d6
| 609864 ||  || — || October 1, 2005 || Mount Lemmon || Mount Lemmon Survey ||  || align=right | 1.8 km || 
|-id=865 bgcolor=#d6d6d6
| 609865 ||  || — || October 7, 2005 || Mauna Kea || Mauna Kea Obs. ||  || align=right | 2.6 km || 
|-id=866 bgcolor=#d6d6d6
| 609866 ||  || — || October 6, 2005 || Mount Lemmon || Mount Lemmon Survey ||  || align=right | 2.3 km || 
|-id=867 bgcolor=#d6d6d6
| 609867 ||  || — || October 11, 2005 || Kitt Peak || Spacewatch ||  || align=right | 1.9 km || 
|-id=868 bgcolor=#d6d6d6
| 609868 ||  || — || October 6, 2005 || Mount Lemmon || Mount Lemmon Survey ||  || align=right | 2.0 km || 
|-id=869 bgcolor=#fefefe
| 609869 ||  || — || October 7, 2005 || Catalina || CSS || H || align=right data-sort-value="0.81" | 810 m || 
|-id=870 bgcolor=#d6d6d6
| 609870 ||  || — || October 22, 2005 || Kitt Peak || Spacewatch ||  || align=right | 2.2 km || 
|-id=871 bgcolor=#d6d6d6
| 609871 ||  || — || October 3, 2005 || Palomar || NEAT ||  || align=right | 3.9 km || 
|-id=872 bgcolor=#d6d6d6
| 609872 ||  || — || October 23, 2005 || Kitt Peak || Spacewatch ||  || align=right | 2.7 km || 
|-id=873 bgcolor=#d6d6d6
| 609873 ||  || — || October 24, 2005 || Kitt Peak || Spacewatch ||  || align=right | 2.3 km || 
|-id=874 bgcolor=#d6d6d6
| 609874 ||  || — || October 22, 2005 || Kitt Peak || Spacewatch ||  || align=right | 1.8 km || 
|-id=875 bgcolor=#E9E9E9
| 609875 ||  || — || October 22, 2005 || Kitt Peak || Spacewatch ||  || align=right data-sort-value="0.79" | 790 m || 
|-id=876 bgcolor=#d6d6d6
| 609876 ||  || — || October 23, 2005 || Kitt Peak || Spacewatch ||  || align=right | 2.1 km || 
|-id=877 bgcolor=#d6d6d6
| 609877 ||  || — || October 24, 2005 || Kitt Peak || Spacewatch ||  || align=right | 1.9 km || 
|-id=878 bgcolor=#d6d6d6
| 609878 ||  || — || October 24, 2005 || Kitt Peak || Spacewatch ||  || align=right | 1.2 km || 
|-id=879 bgcolor=#d6d6d6
| 609879 ||  || — || October 24, 2005 || Kitt Peak || Spacewatch ||  || align=right | 1.7 km || 
|-id=880 bgcolor=#d6d6d6
| 609880 ||  || — || October 24, 2005 || Kitt Peak || Spacewatch || EOS || align=right | 1.7 km || 
|-id=881 bgcolor=#d6d6d6
| 609881 ||  || — || October 25, 2005 || Kitt Peak || Spacewatch ||  || align=right | 2.0 km || 
|-id=882 bgcolor=#E9E9E9
| 609882 ||  || — || October 25, 2005 || Mount Lemmon || Mount Lemmon Survey ||  || align=right data-sort-value="0.56" | 560 m || 
|-id=883 bgcolor=#d6d6d6
| 609883 ||  || — || October 1, 2005 || Mount Lemmon || Mount Lemmon Survey || EOS || align=right | 1.4 km || 
|-id=884 bgcolor=#d6d6d6
| 609884 ||  || — || October 25, 2005 || Kitt Peak || Spacewatch ||  || align=right | 2.4 km || 
|-id=885 bgcolor=#d6d6d6
| 609885 ||  || — || October 25, 2005 || Mount Lemmon || Mount Lemmon Survey ||  || align=right | 2.0 km || 
|-id=886 bgcolor=#d6d6d6
| 609886 ||  || — || October 25, 2005 || Kitt Peak || Spacewatch ||  || align=right | 2.9 km || 
|-id=887 bgcolor=#E9E9E9
| 609887 ||  || — || October 25, 2005 || Kitt Peak || Spacewatch ||  || align=right data-sort-value="0.62" | 620 m || 
|-id=888 bgcolor=#d6d6d6
| 609888 ||  || — || October 25, 2005 || Kitt Peak || Spacewatch ||  || align=right | 1.9 km || 
|-id=889 bgcolor=#fefefe
| 609889 ||  || — || October 25, 2005 || Kitt Peak || Spacewatch ||  || align=right data-sort-value="0.94" | 940 m || 
|-id=890 bgcolor=#fefefe
| 609890 ||  || — || October 25, 2005 || Kitt Peak || Spacewatch ||  || align=right data-sort-value="0.81" | 810 m || 
|-id=891 bgcolor=#d6d6d6
| 609891 ||  || — || October 25, 2005 || Kitt Peak || Spacewatch ||  || align=right | 3.1 km || 
|-id=892 bgcolor=#d6d6d6
| 609892 ||  || — || October 25, 2005 || Kitt Peak || Spacewatch ||  || align=right | 2.0 km || 
|-id=893 bgcolor=#fefefe
| 609893 ||  || — || October 25, 2005 || Kitt Peak || Spacewatch ||  || align=right data-sort-value="0.71" | 710 m || 
|-id=894 bgcolor=#fefefe
| 609894 ||  || — || October 25, 2005 || Kitt Peak || Spacewatch ||  || align=right data-sort-value="0.81" | 810 m || 
|-id=895 bgcolor=#d6d6d6
| 609895 ||  || — || October 6, 2005 || Mount Lemmon || Mount Lemmon Survey ||  || align=right | 2.2 km || 
|-id=896 bgcolor=#d6d6d6
| 609896 ||  || — || October 28, 2005 || Mount Lemmon || Mount Lemmon Survey ||  || align=right | 2.3 km || 
|-id=897 bgcolor=#d6d6d6
| 609897 ||  || — || October 28, 2005 || Kitt Peak || Spacewatch ||  || align=right | 2.7 km || 
|-id=898 bgcolor=#d6d6d6
| 609898 ||  || — || October 24, 2005 || Kitt Peak || Spacewatch ||  || align=right | 2.7 km || 
|-id=899 bgcolor=#d6d6d6
| 609899 ||  || — || October 24, 2005 || Kitt Peak || Spacewatch ||  || align=right | 1.6 km || 
|-id=900 bgcolor=#fefefe
| 609900 ||  || — || October 26, 2005 || Kitt Peak || Spacewatch ||  || align=right data-sort-value="0.64" | 640 m || 
|}

609901–610000 

|-bgcolor=#d6d6d6
| 609901 ||  || — || October 26, 2005 || Kitt Peak || Spacewatch || 3:2 || align=right | 3.7 km || 
|-id=902 bgcolor=#fefefe
| 609902 ||  || — || October 26, 2005 || Kitt Peak || Spacewatch ||  || align=right data-sort-value="0.62" | 620 m || 
|-id=903 bgcolor=#d6d6d6
| 609903 ||  || — || October 26, 2005 || Kitt Peak || Spacewatch ||  || align=right | 1.9 km || 
|-id=904 bgcolor=#d6d6d6
| 609904 ||  || — || October 26, 2005 || Kitt Peak || Spacewatch ||  || align=right | 2.3 km || 
|-id=905 bgcolor=#FA8072
| 609905 ||  || — || October 10, 2005 || Catalina || CSS ||  || align=right data-sort-value="0.39" | 390 m || 
|-id=906 bgcolor=#fefefe
| 609906 ||  || — || October 26, 2005 || Kitt Peak || Spacewatch ||  || align=right data-sort-value="0.60" | 600 m || 
|-id=907 bgcolor=#d6d6d6
| 609907 ||  || — || October 27, 2005 || Kitt Peak || Spacewatch ||  || align=right | 1.9 km || 
|-id=908 bgcolor=#d6d6d6
| 609908 ||  || — || October 27, 2005 || Kitt Peak || Spacewatch ||  || align=right | 2.0 km || 
|-id=909 bgcolor=#fefefe
| 609909 ||  || — || October 1, 2005 || Kitt Peak || Spacewatch ||  || align=right data-sort-value="0.54" | 540 m || 
|-id=910 bgcolor=#d6d6d6
| 609910 ||  || — || October 28, 2005 || Kitt Peak || Spacewatch ||  || align=right | 1.9 km || 
|-id=911 bgcolor=#d6d6d6
| 609911 ||  || — || October 29, 2005 || Kitt Peak || Spacewatch ||  || align=right | 2.0 km || 
|-id=912 bgcolor=#d6d6d6
| 609912 ||  || — || October 31, 2005 || Kitt Peak || Spacewatch ||  || align=right | 1.7 km || 
|-id=913 bgcolor=#d6d6d6
| 609913 ||  || — || October 31, 2005 || Kitt Peak || Spacewatch ||  || align=right | 2.3 km || 
|-id=914 bgcolor=#d6d6d6
| 609914 ||  || — || October 31, 2005 || Kitt Peak || Spacewatch ||  || align=right | 2.1 km || 
|-id=915 bgcolor=#d6d6d6
| 609915 ||  || — || October 31, 2005 || Kitt Peak || Spacewatch ||  || align=right | 2.3 km || 
|-id=916 bgcolor=#d6d6d6
| 609916 ||  || — || October 26, 2005 || Kitt Peak || Spacewatch ||  || align=right | 1.6 km || 
|-id=917 bgcolor=#d6d6d6
| 609917 ||  || — || October 27, 2005 || Kitt Peak || Spacewatch ||  || align=right | 1.9 km || 
|-id=918 bgcolor=#d6d6d6
| 609918 ||  || — || October 27, 2005 || Mount Lemmon || Mount Lemmon Survey ||  || align=right | 2.1 km || 
|-id=919 bgcolor=#fefefe
| 609919 ||  || — || October 28, 2005 || Mount Lemmon || Mount Lemmon Survey ||  || align=right data-sort-value="0.79" | 790 m || 
|-id=920 bgcolor=#d6d6d6
| 609920 ||  || — || October 29, 2005 || Mount Lemmon || Mount Lemmon Survey ||  || align=right | 1.8 km || 
|-id=921 bgcolor=#fefefe
| 609921 ||  || — || October 14, 2001 || Kitt Peak || Spacewatch ||  || align=right data-sort-value="0.71" | 710 m || 
|-id=922 bgcolor=#d6d6d6
| 609922 ||  || — || October 27, 2005 || Kitt Peak || Spacewatch ||  || align=right | 2.1 km || 
|-id=923 bgcolor=#d6d6d6
| 609923 ||  || — || October 22, 2005 || Kitt Peak || Spacewatch ||  || align=right | 2.0 km || 
|-id=924 bgcolor=#d6d6d6
| 609924 ||  || — || October 29, 2005 || Mount Lemmon || Mount Lemmon Survey ||  || align=right | 1.9 km || 
|-id=925 bgcolor=#d6d6d6
| 609925 ||  || — || October 25, 2005 || Kitt Peak || Spacewatch ||  || align=right | 2.0 km || 
|-id=926 bgcolor=#d6d6d6
| 609926 ||  || — || September 30, 2005 || Mount Lemmon || Mount Lemmon Survey ||  || align=right | 2.2 km || 
|-id=927 bgcolor=#d6d6d6
| 609927 ||  || — || October 28, 2005 || Kitt Peak || Spacewatch ||  || align=right | 1.9 km || 
|-id=928 bgcolor=#d6d6d6
| 609928 ||  || — || October 28, 2005 || Kitt Peak || Spacewatch ||  || align=right | 2.3 km || 
|-id=929 bgcolor=#d6d6d6
| 609929 ||  || — || October 1, 2005 || Mount Lemmon || Mount Lemmon Survey ||  || align=right | 2.2 km || 
|-id=930 bgcolor=#fefefe
| 609930 ||  || — || September 30, 2005 || Mount Lemmon || Mount Lemmon Survey ||  || align=right data-sort-value="0.58" | 580 m || 
|-id=931 bgcolor=#d6d6d6
| 609931 ||  || — || October 30, 2005 || Mount Lemmon || Mount Lemmon Survey ||  || align=right | 1.8 km || 
|-id=932 bgcolor=#d6d6d6
| 609932 ||  || — || September 30, 2005 || Mount Lemmon || Mount Lemmon Survey ||  || align=right | 1.5 km || 
|-id=933 bgcolor=#d6d6d6
| 609933 ||  || — || October 31, 2005 || Mount Lemmon || Mount Lemmon Survey ||  || align=right | 1.8 km || 
|-id=934 bgcolor=#d6d6d6
| 609934 ||  || — || October 23, 2005 || Palomar || NEAT ||  || align=right | 2.7 km || 
|-id=935 bgcolor=#d6d6d6
| 609935 ||  || — || October 24, 2005 || Mauna Kea || Mauna Kea Obs. || VER || align=right | 2.9 km || 
|-id=936 bgcolor=#E9E9E9
| 609936 ||  || — || February 10, 2010 || Kitt Peak || Spacewatch ||  || align=right | 1.1 km || 
|-id=937 bgcolor=#d6d6d6
| 609937 ||  || — || October 25, 2005 || Mount Lemmon || Mount Lemmon Survey || 3:2 || align=right | 3.6 km || 
|-id=938 bgcolor=#d6d6d6
| 609938 ||  || — || October 30, 2005 || Apache Point || SDSS Collaboration ||  || align=right | 1.9 km || 
|-id=939 bgcolor=#d6d6d6
| 609939 ||  || — || October 30, 2005 || Apache Point || SDSS Collaboration ||  || align=right | 2.2 km || 
|-id=940 bgcolor=#d6d6d6
| 609940 ||  || — || October 27, 2005 || Apache Point || SDSS Collaboration || 3:2 || align=right | 4.1 km || 
|-id=941 bgcolor=#d6d6d6
| 609941 ||  || — || October 27, 2005 || Apache Point || SDSS Collaboration || EOS || align=right | 1.2 km || 
|-id=942 bgcolor=#d6d6d6
| 609942 ||  || — || November 1, 2005 || Mount Lemmon || Mount Lemmon Survey ||  || align=right | 1.9 km || 
|-id=943 bgcolor=#d6d6d6
| 609943 ||  || — || February 17, 2007 || Mount Lemmon || Mount Lemmon Survey ||  || align=right | 1.8 km || 
|-id=944 bgcolor=#d6d6d6
| 609944 ||  || — || October 25, 2005 || Apache Point || SDSS Collaboration ||  || align=right | 2.3 km || 
|-id=945 bgcolor=#d6d6d6
| 609945 ||  || — || October 25, 2005 || Mount Lemmon || Mount Lemmon Survey ||  || align=right | 2.4 km || 
|-id=946 bgcolor=#d6d6d6
| 609946 ||  || — || January 24, 2015 || Haleakala || Pan-STARRS || 3:2 || align=right | 2.9 km || 
|-id=947 bgcolor=#d6d6d6
| 609947 ||  || — || December 31, 2011 || Mount Lemmon || Mount Lemmon Survey ||  || align=right | 2.3 km || 
|-id=948 bgcolor=#E9E9E9
| 609948 ||  || — || October 30, 2005 || Kitt Peak || Spacewatch ||  || align=right data-sort-value="0.56" | 560 m || 
|-id=949 bgcolor=#d6d6d6
| 609949 ||  || — || October 24, 2005 || Mauna Kea || Mauna Kea Obs. ||  || align=right | 2.8 km || 
|-id=950 bgcolor=#fefefe
| 609950 ||  || — || February 17, 2007 || Mount Lemmon || Mount Lemmon Survey ||  || align=right data-sort-value="0.81" | 810 m || 
|-id=951 bgcolor=#d6d6d6
| 609951 ||  || — || March 18, 2013 || Mount Lemmon || Mount Lemmon Survey ||  || align=right | 2.1 km || 
|-id=952 bgcolor=#d6d6d6
| 609952 ||  || — || October 23, 2005 || Kitt Peak || Spacewatch ||  || align=right | 2.2 km || 
|-id=953 bgcolor=#d6d6d6
| 609953 ||  || — || November 6, 2010 || Kitt Peak || Spacewatch ||  || align=right | 2.0 km || 
|-id=954 bgcolor=#d6d6d6
| 609954 ||  || — || October 31, 2005 || Mauna Kea || Mauna Kea Obs. ||  || align=right | 2.2 km || 
|-id=955 bgcolor=#fefefe
| 609955 ||  || — || October 27, 2005 || Mount Lemmon || Mount Lemmon Survey ||  || align=right data-sort-value="0.66" | 660 m || 
|-id=956 bgcolor=#d6d6d6
| 609956 ||  || — || October 29, 2005 || Catalina || CSS ||  || align=right | 2.3 km || 
|-id=957 bgcolor=#d6d6d6
| 609957 ||  || — || October 25, 2005 || Kitt Peak || Spacewatch ||  || align=right | 2.0 km || 
|-id=958 bgcolor=#d6d6d6
| 609958 ||  || — || October 31, 2005 || Kitt Peak || Spacewatch ||  || align=right | 2.4 km || 
|-id=959 bgcolor=#d6d6d6
| 609959 ||  || — || October 28, 2005 || Mount Lemmon || Mount Lemmon Survey ||  || align=right | 1.7 km || 
|-id=960 bgcolor=#d6d6d6
| 609960 ||  || — || October 27, 2005 || Kitt Peak || Spacewatch ||  || align=right | 1.8 km || 
|-id=961 bgcolor=#d6d6d6
| 609961 ||  || — || October 26, 2005 || Kitt Peak || Spacewatch ||  || align=right | 1.9 km || 
|-id=962 bgcolor=#d6d6d6
| 609962 ||  || — || November 3, 2005 || Kitt Peak || Spacewatch ||  || align=right | 1.9 km || 
|-id=963 bgcolor=#d6d6d6
| 609963 ||  || — || October 27, 2005 || Kitt Peak || Spacewatch ||  || align=right | 1.9 km || 
|-id=964 bgcolor=#d6d6d6
| 609964 ||  || — || October 27, 2005 || Catalina || CSS ||  || align=right | 3.1 km || 
|-id=965 bgcolor=#d6d6d6
| 609965 ||  || — || November 1, 2005 || Kitt Peak || Spacewatch ||  || align=right | 2.3 km || 
|-id=966 bgcolor=#d6d6d6
| 609966 ||  || — || November 1, 2005 || Kitt Peak || Spacewatch ||  || align=right | 1.9 km || 
|-id=967 bgcolor=#d6d6d6
| 609967 ||  || — || October 29, 2005 || Mount Lemmon || Mount Lemmon Survey ||  || align=right | 2.4 km || 
|-id=968 bgcolor=#d6d6d6
| 609968 ||  || — || November 3, 2005 || Mount Lemmon || Mount Lemmon Survey ||  || align=right | 2.1 km || 
|-id=969 bgcolor=#d6d6d6
| 609969 ||  || — || November 4, 2005 || Mount Lemmon || Mount Lemmon Survey ||  || align=right | 2.0 km || 
|-id=970 bgcolor=#d6d6d6
| 609970 ||  || — || November 5, 2005 || Kitt Peak || Spacewatch ||  || align=right | 1.8 km || 
|-id=971 bgcolor=#fefefe
| 609971 ||  || — || November 5, 2005 || Mount Lemmon || Mount Lemmon Survey ||  || align=right data-sort-value="0.70" | 700 m || 
|-id=972 bgcolor=#d6d6d6
| 609972 ||  || — || April 19, 2002 || Kitt Peak || Spacewatch ||  || align=right | 2.3 km || 
|-id=973 bgcolor=#fefefe
| 609973 ||  || — || November 4, 2005 || Kitt Peak || Spacewatch ||  || align=right data-sort-value="0.49" | 490 m || 
|-id=974 bgcolor=#d6d6d6
| 609974 ||  || — || August 31, 2005 || Kitt Peak || Spacewatch ||  || align=right | 1.7 km || 
|-id=975 bgcolor=#d6d6d6
| 609975 ||  || — || November 3, 2005 || Kitt Peak || Spacewatch ||  || align=right | 1.8 km || 
|-id=976 bgcolor=#d6d6d6
| 609976 ||  || — || November 3, 2005 || Kitt Peak || Spacewatch ||  || align=right | 2.2 km || 
|-id=977 bgcolor=#d6d6d6
| 609977 ||  || — || November 4, 2005 || Kitt Peak || Spacewatch ||  || align=right | 1.9 km || 
|-id=978 bgcolor=#d6d6d6
| 609978 ||  || — || September 30, 2005 || Mount Lemmon || Mount Lemmon Survey ||  || align=right | 2.4 km || 
|-id=979 bgcolor=#d6d6d6
| 609979 ||  || — || November 2, 2005 || Mount Lemmon || Mount Lemmon Survey ||  || align=right | 2.9 km || 
|-id=980 bgcolor=#E9E9E9
| 609980 ||  || — || November 5, 2005 || Kitt Peak || Spacewatch ||  || align=right data-sort-value="0.91" | 910 m || 
|-id=981 bgcolor=#E9E9E9
| 609981 ||  || — || November 3, 2005 || Mount Lemmon || Mount Lemmon Survey ||  || align=right data-sort-value="0.76" | 760 m || 
|-id=982 bgcolor=#d6d6d6
| 609982 ||  || — || November 3, 2005 || Mount Lemmon || Mount Lemmon Survey ||  || align=right | 2.1 km || 
|-id=983 bgcolor=#d6d6d6
| 609983 ||  || — || October 25, 2005 || Kitt Peak || Spacewatch ||  || align=right | 2.2 km || 
|-id=984 bgcolor=#d6d6d6
| 609984 ||  || — || November 5, 2005 || Kitt Peak || Spacewatch ||  || align=right | 2.2 km || 
|-id=985 bgcolor=#d6d6d6
| 609985 ||  || — || October 29, 2005 || Kitt Peak || Spacewatch ||  || align=right | 2.6 km || 
|-id=986 bgcolor=#d6d6d6
| 609986 ||  || — || November 6, 2005 || Kitt Peak || Spacewatch ||  || align=right | 1.8 km || 
|-id=987 bgcolor=#fefefe
| 609987 ||  || — || November 3, 2005 || Mount Lemmon || Mount Lemmon Survey ||  || align=right data-sort-value="0.50" | 500 m || 
|-id=988 bgcolor=#d6d6d6
| 609988 ||  || — || April 5, 2003 || Kitt Peak || Spacewatch ||  || align=right | 3.0 km || 
|-id=989 bgcolor=#d6d6d6
| 609989 ||  || — || November 11, 2005 || Kitt Peak || Spacewatch ||  || align=right | 2.3 km || 
|-id=990 bgcolor=#fefefe
| 609990 ||  || — || November 1, 2005 || Catalina || CSS ||  || align=right data-sort-value="0.98" | 980 m || 
|-id=991 bgcolor=#d6d6d6
| 609991 ||  || — || November 5, 2005 || Mount Lemmon || Mount Lemmon Survey ||  || align=right | 2.3 km || 
|-id=992 bgcolor=#d6d6d6
| 609992 ||  || — || October 27, 2005 || Kitt Peak || Spacewatch || EOS || align=right | 1.8 km || 
|-id=993 bgcolor=#d6d6d6
| 609993 ||  || — || October 27, 2005 || Apache Point || SDSS Collaboration ||  || align=right | 1.8 km || 
|-id=994 bgcolor=#d6d6d6
| 609994 ||  || — || October 30, 2005 || Apache Point || SDSS Collaboration ||  || align=right | 1.7 km || 
|-id=995 bgcolor=#d6d6d6
| 609995 ||  || — || October 30, 2005 || Apache Point || SDSS Collaboration || EOS || align=right | 1.1 km || 
|-id=996 bgcolor=#d6d6d6
| 609996 ||  || — || March 28, 2008 || Mount Lemmon || Mount Lemmon Survey || 3:2 || align=right | 3.6 km || 
|-id=997 bgcolor=#d6d6d6
| 609997 ||  || — || November 1, 2005 || Mount Lemmon || Mount Lemmon Survey ||  || align=right | 2.3 km || 
|-id=998 bgcolor=#fefefe
| 609998 ||  || — || November 6, 2005 || Kitt Peak || Spacewatch ||  || align=right | 1.1 km || 
|-id=999 bgcolor=#E9E9E9
| 609999 ||  || — || October 10, 2012 || Haleakala || Pan-STARRS ||  || align=right | 1.0 km || 
|-id=000 bgcolor=#d6d6d6
| 610000 ||  || — || November 1, 2005 || Mount Lemmon || Mount Lemmon Survey ||  || align=right | 2.4 km || 
|}

References

External links 
 Discovery Circumstances: Numbered Minor Planets (605001)–(610000) (IAU Minor Planet Center)

0609